

64001–64100 

|-bgcolor=#fefefe
| 64001 ||  || — || September 19, 2001 || Goodricke-Pigott || R. A. Tucker || — || align=right | 2.0 km || 
|-id=002 bgcolor=#fefefe
| 64002 ||  || — || September 18, 2001 || Desert Eagle || W. K. Y. Yeung || — || align=right | 1.6 km || 
|-id=003 bgcolor=#fefefe
| 64003 ||  || — || September 16, 2001 || Socorro || LINEAR || — || align=right | 1.2 km || 
|-id=004 bgcolor=#d6d6d6
| 64004 ||  || — || September 16, 2001 || Socorro || LINEAR || HYG || align=right | 6.1 km || 
|-id=005 bgcolor=#fefefe
| 64005 ||  || — || September 16, 2001 || Socorro || LINEAR || — || align=right | 4.3 km || 
|-id=006 bgcolor=#d6d6d6
| 64006 ||  || — || September 16, 2001 || Socorro || LINEAR || — || align=right | 5.1 km || 
|-id=007 bgcolor=#fefefe
| 64007 ||  || — || September 16, 2001 || Socorro || LINEAR || — || align=right | 1.8 km || 
|-id=008 bgcolor=#fefefe
| 64008 ||  || — || September 16, 2001 || Socorro || LINEAR || — || align=right | 1.1 km || 
|-id=009 bgcolor=#fefefe
| 64009 ||  || — || September 16, 2001 || Socorro || LINEAR || FLO || align=right | 1.3 km || 
|-id=010 bgcolor=#E9E9E9
| 64010 ||  || — || September 16, 2001 || Socorro || LINEAR || — || align=right | 2.0 km || 
|-id=011 bgcolor=#E9E9E9
| 64011 ||  || — || September 16, 2001 || Socorro || LINEAR || PAD || align=right | 5.9 km || 
|-id=012 bgcolor=#fefefe
| 64012 ||  || — || September 16, 2001 || Socorro || LINEAR || NYS || align=right | 1.6 km || 
|-id=013 bgcolor=#fefefe
| 64013 ||  || — || September 16, 2001 || Socorro || LINEAR || FLO || align=right | 1.7 km || 
|-id=014 bgcolor=#fefefe
| 64014 ||  || — || September 16, 2001 || Socorro || LINEAR || — || align=right | 1.3 km || 
|-id=015 bgcolor=#fefefe
| 64015 ||  || — || September 16, 2001 || Socorro || LINEAR || — || align=right | 1.8 km || 
|-id=016 bgcolor=#d6d6d6
| 64016 ||  || — || September 16, 2001 || Socorro || LINEAR || — || align=right | 5.6 km || 
|-id=017 bgcolor=#fefefe
| 64017 ||  || — || September 17, 2001 || Socorro || LINEAR || FLO || align=right | 1.4 km || 
|-id=018 bgcolor=#fefefe
| 64018 ||  || — || September 17, 2001 || Socorro || LINEAR || — || align=right | 4.0 km || 
|-id=019 bgcolor=#d6d6d6
| 64019 ||  || — || September 17, 2001 || Socorro || LINEAR || — || align=right | 6.9 km || 
|-id=020 bgcolor=#fefefe
| 64020 ||  || — || September 17, 2001 || Socorro || LINEAR || NYS || align=right | 3.0 km || 
|-id=021 bgcolor=#d6d6d6
| 64021 ||  || — || September 17, 2001 || Socorro || LINEAR || — || align=right | 6.0 km || 
|-id=022 bgcolor=#fefefe
| 64022 ||  || — || September 17, 2001 || Socorro || LINEAR || V || align=right | 1.4 km || 
|-id=023 bgcolor=#fefefe
| 64023 ||  || — || September 17, 2001 || Socorro || LINEAR || V || align=right | 1.7 km || 
|-id=024 bgcolor=#d6d6d6
| 64024 ||  || — || September 17, 2001 || Socorro || LINEAR || EOS || align=right | 4.1 km || 
|-id=025 bgcolor=#fefefe
| 64025 ||  || — || September 17, 2001 || Socorro || LINEAR || — || align=right | 2.3 km || 
|-id=026 bgcolor=#E9E9E9
| 64026 ||  || — || September 17, 2001 || Socorro || LINEAR || — || align=right | 6.8 km || 
|-id=027 bgcolor=#d6d6d6
| 64027 ||  || — || September 17, 2001 || Socorro || LINEAR || EOS || align=right | 4.5 km || 
|-id=028 bgcolor=#fefefe
| 64028 ||  || — || September 17, 2001 || Socorro || LINEAR || — || align=right | 4.7 km || 
|-id=029 bgcolor=#fefefe
| 64029 ||  || — || September 19, 2001 || Socorro || LINEAR || — || align=right | 1.9 km || 
|-id=030 bgcolor=#C2FFFF
| 64030 ||  || — || September 19, 2001 || Socorro || LINEAR || L5 || align=right | 20 km || 
|-id=031 bgcolor=#fefefe
| 64031 ||  || — || September 24, 2001 || Fountain Hills || C. W. Juels, P. R. Holvorcem || H || align=right | 2.3 km || 
|-id=032 bgcolor=#fefefe
| 64032 ||  || — || September 16, 2001 || Socorro || LINEAR || MAS || align=right data-sort-value="0.92" | 920 m || 
|-id=033 bgcolor=#fefefe
| 64033 ||  || — || September 16, 2001 || Socorro || LINEAR || — || align=right | 2.0 km || 
|-id=034 bgcolor=#d6d6d6
| 64034 ||  || — || September 16, 2001 || Socorro || LINEAR || — || align=right | 7.1 km || 
|-id=035 bgcolor=#E9E9E9
| 64035 ||  || — || September 17, 2001 || Socorro || LINEAR || EUN || align=right | 3.3 km || 
|-id=036 bgcolor=#fefefe
| 64036 ||  || — || September 19, 2001 || Socorro || LINEAR || MAS || align=right | 1.2 km || 
|-id=037 bgcolor=#d6d6d6
| 64037 ||  || — || September 19, 2001 || Socorro || LINEAR || — || align=right | 4.8 km || 
|-id=038 bgcolor=#fefefe
| 64038 ||  || — || September 19, 2001 || Socorro || LINEAR || — || align=right | 1.6 km || 
|-id=039 bgcolor=#fefefe
| 64039 ||  || — || September 19, 2001 || Socorro || LINEAR || — || align=right | 1.5 km || 
|-id=040 bgcolor=#d6d6d6
| 64040 ||  || — || September 19, 2001 || Socorro || LINEAR || — || align=right | 6.0 km || 
|-id=041 bgcolor=#fefefe
| 64041 ||  || — || September 19, 2001 || Socorro || LINEAR || NYS || align=right | 1.6 km || 
|-id=042 bgcolor=#E9E9E9
| 64042 ||  || — || September 19, 2001 || Socorro || LINEAR || — || align=right | 3.2 km || 
|-id=043 bgcolor=#d6d6d6
| 64043 ||  || — || September 19, 2001 || Socorro || LINEAR || — || align=right | 4.7 km || 
|-id=044 bgcolor=#fefefe
| 64044 ||  || — || September 19, 2001 || Socorro || LINEAR || — || align=right | 3.3 km || 
|-id=045 bgcolor=#fefefe
| 64045 ||  || — || September 19, 2001 || Socorro || LINEAR || — || align=right | 1.4 km || 
|-id=046 bgcolor=#d6d6d6
| 64046 ||  || — || September 19, 2001 || Socorro || LINEAR || EOS || align=right | 6.1 km || 
|-id=047 bgcolor=#fefefe
| 64047 ||  || — || September 19, 2001 || Socorro || LINEAR || — || align=right | 1.6 km || 
|-id=048 bgcolor=#E9E9E9
| 64048 ||  || — || September 19, 2001 || Socorro || LINEAR || — || align=right | 3.9 km || 
|-id=049 bgcolor=#E9E9E9
| 64049 ||  || — || September 19, 2001 || Socorro || LINEAR || XIZ || align=right | 3.1 km || 
|-id=050 bgcolor=#fefefe
| 64050 ||  || — || September 19, 2001 || Socorro || LINEAR || FLO || align=right | 1.5 km || 
|-id=051 bgcolor=#d6d6d6
| 64051 ||  || — || September 19, 2001 || Socorro || LINEAR || — || align=right | 6.8 km || 
|-id=052 bgcolor=#d6d6d6
| 64052 ||  || — || September 19, 2001 || Socorro || LINEAR || — || align=right | 5.7 km || 
|-id=053 bgcolor=#d6d6d6
| 64053 ||  || — || September 19, 2001 || Socorro || LINEAR || — || align=right | 9.1 km || 
|-id=054 bgcolor=#E9E9E9
| 64054 ||  || — || September 19, 2001 || Socorro || LINEAR || — || align=right | 2.9 km || 
|-id=055 bgcolor=#fefefe
| 64055 ||  || — || September 19, 2001 || Socorro || LINEAR || MAS || align=right | 1.5 km || 
|-id=056 bgcolor=#fefefe
| 64056 ||  || — || September 19, 2001 || Socorro || LINEAR || — || align=right | 2.3 km || 
|-id=057 bgcolor=#fefefe
| 64057 ||  || — || September 20, 2001 || Socorro || LINEAR || NYS || align=right | 3.9 km || 
|-id=058 bgcolor=#fefefe
| 64058 ||  || — || September 20, 2001 || Socorro || LINEAR || — || align=right | 2.1 km || 
|-id=059 bgcolor=#E9E9E9
| 64059 ||  || — || September 20, 2001 || Socorro || LINEAR || — || align=right | 3.6 km || 
|-id=060 bgcolor=#fefefe
| 64060 ||  || — || September 25, 2001 || Fountain Hills || C. W. Juels, P. R. Holvorcem || — || align=right | 2.8 km || 
|-id=061 bgcolor=#fefefe
| 64061 ||  || — || September 25, 2001 || Desert Eagle || W. K. Y. Yeung || FLO || align=right | 1.6 km || 
|-id=062 bgcolor=#E9E9E9
| 64062 ||  || — || September 25, 2001 || Desert Eagle || W. K. Y. Yeung || — || align=right | 3.2 km || 
|-id=063 bgcolor=#fefefe
| 64063 ||  || — || September 25, 2001 || Desert Eagle || W. K. Y. Yeung || NYS || align=right | 1.7 km || 
|-id=064 bgcolor=#fefefe
| 64064 ||  || — || September 25, 2001 || Desert Eagle || W. K. Y. Yeung || FLO || align=right | 1.5 km || 
|-id=065 bgcolor=#fefefe
| 64065 ||  || — || September 25, 2001 || Desert Eagle || W. K. Y. Yeung || — || align=right | 1.7 km || 
|-id=066 bgcolor=#E9E9E9
| 64066 ||  || — || September 25, 2001 || Desert Eagle || W. K. Y. Yeung || MAR || align=right | 2.4 km || 
|-id=067 bgcolor=#E9E9E9
| 64067 ||  || — || September 18, 2001 || Palomar || NEAT || ADE || align=right | 9.0 km || 
|-id=068 bgcolor=#fefefe
| 64068 ||  || — || September 20, 2001 || Socorro || LINEAR || NYS || align=right | 3.5 km || 
|-id=069 bgcolor=#d6d6d6
| 64069 ||  || — || September 20, 2001 || Socorro || LINEAR || THM || align=right | 6.1 km || 
|-id=070 bgcolor=#fefefe
| 64070 NEAT ||  ||  || September 24, 2001 || Fountain Hills || C. W. Juels, P. R. Holvorcem || — || align=right | 3.8 km || 
|-id=071 bgcolor=#d6d6d6
| 64071 ||  || — || September 21, 2001 || Palomar || NEAT || — || align=right | 7.3 km || 
|-id=072 bgcolor=#fefefe
| 64072 ||  || — || September 21, 2001 || Palomar || NEAT || FLO || align=right | 1.7 km || 
|-id=073 bgcolor=#d6d6d6
| 64073 ||  || — || September 21, 2001 || Anderson Mesa || LONEOS || — || align=right | 10 km || 
|-id=074 bgcolor=#fefefe
| 64074 ||  || — || September 21, 2001 || Anderson Mesa || LONEOS || — || align=right | 3.0 km || 
|-id=075 bgcolor=#fefefe
| 64075 ||  || — || September 21, 2001 || Anderson Mesa || LONEOS || — || align=right | 2.9 km || 
|-id=076 bgcolor=#fefefe
| 64076 ||  || — || September 21, 2001 || Anderson Mesa || LONEOS || — || align=right | 2.4 km || 
|-id=077 bgcolor=#fefefe
| 64077 ||  || — || September 21, 2001 || Anderson Mesa || LONEOS || FLO || align=right | 1.8 km || 
|-id=078 bgcolor=#fefefe
| 64078 ||  || — || September 21, 2001 || Anderson Mesa || LONEOS || NYS || align=right | 1.9 km || 
|-id=079 bgcolor=#fefefe
| 64079 ||  || — || September 21, 2001 || Anderson Mesa || LONEOS || — || align=right | 2.3 km || 
|-id=080 bgcolor=#E9E9E9
| 64080 ||  || — || September 21, 2001 || Anderson Mesa || LONEOS || — || align=right | 2.6 km || 
|-id=081 bgcolor=#E9E9E9
| 64081 ||  || — || September 21, 2001 || Anderson Mesa || LONEOS || — || align=right | 3.7 km || 
|-id=082 bgcolor=#fefefe
| 64082 ||  || — || September 21, 2001 || Anderson Mesa || LONEOS || NYS || align=right | 2.1 km || 
|-id=083 bgcolor=#fefefe
| 64083 ||  || — || September 21, 2001 || Anderson Mesa || LONEOS || — || align=right | 2.0 km || 
|-id=084 bgcolor=#E9E9E9
| 64084 ||  || — || September 22, 2001 || Socorro || LINEAR || EUN || align=right | 5.5 km || 
|-id=085 bgcolor=#E9E9E9
| 64085 ||  || — || September 22, 2001 || Socorro || LINEAR || EUN || align=right | 6.0 km || 
|-id=086 bgcolor=#E9E9E9
| 64086 ||  || — || September 22, 2001 || Socorro || LINEAR || ADE || align=right | 5.3 km || 
|-id=087 bgcolor=#fefefe
| 64087 ||  || — || September 22, 2001 || Kitt Peak || Spacewatch || — || align=right | 1.7 km || 
|-id=088 bgcolor=#E9E9E9
| 64088 ||  || — || September 28, 2001 || Fountain Hills || C. W. Juels, P. R. Holvorcem || — || align=right | 5.2 km || 
|-id=089 bgcolor=#d6d6d6
| 64089 ||  || — || September 27, 2001 || Palomar || NEAT || — || align=right | 9.1 km || 
|-id=090 bgcolor=#E9E9E9
| 64090 ||  || — || September 22, 2001 || Goodricke-Pigott || R. A. Tucker || — || align=right | 5.2 km || 
|-id=091 bgcolor=#fefefe
| 64091 ||  || — || September 27, 2001 || Palomar || NEAT || — || align=right | 2.5 km || 
|-id=092 bgcolor=#E9E9E9
| 64092 ||  || — || September 27, 2001 || Palomar || NEAT || — || align=right | 3.3 km || 
|-id=093 bgcolor=#E9E9E9
| 64093 ||  || — || September 17, 2001 || Anderson Mesa || LONEOS || — || align=right | 6.2 km || 
|-id=094 bgcolor=#d6d6d6
| 64094 ||  || — || September 17, 2001 || Socorro || LINEAR || HYG || align=right | 4.2 km || 
|-id=095 bgcolor=#fefefe
| 64095 ||  || — || September 21, 2001 || Socorro || LINEAR || MAS || align=right | 1.6 km || 
|-id=096 bgcolor=#E9E9E9
| 64096 ||  || — || September 19, 2001 || Kitt Peak || Spacewatch || — || align=right | 3.0 km || 
|-id=097 bgcolor=#d6d6d6
| 64097 ||  || — || September 20, 2001 || Socorro || LINEAR || HYG || align=right | 7.9 km || 
|-id=098 bgcolor=#E9E9E9
| 64098 ||  || — || September 21, 2001 || Palomar || NEAT || WIT || align=right | 2.7 km || 
|-id=099 bgcolor=#d6d6d6
| 64099 ||  || — || September 25, 2001 || Socorro || LINEAR || LIX || align=right | 7.9 km || 
|-id=100 bgcolor=#fefefe
| 64100 || 2001 TY || — || October 9, 2001 || Socorro || LINEAR || PHO || align=right | 4.2 km || 
|}

64101–64200 

|-bgcolor=#fefefe
| 64101 ||  || — || October 8, 2001 || Palomar || NEAT || — || align=right | 1.7 km || 
|-id=102 bgcolor=#fefefe
| 64102 ||  || — || October 7, 2001 || Palomar || NEAT || FLO || align=right | 1.4 km || 
|-id=103 bgcolor=#fefefe
| 64103 ||  || — || October 7, 2001 || Palomar || NEAT || FLO || align=right | 2.0 km || 
|-id=104 bgcolor=#d6d6d6
| 64104 ||  || — || October 7, 2001 || Palomar || NEAT || — || align=right | 5.8 km || 
|-id=105 bgcolor=#d6d6d6
| 64105 ||  || — || October 10, 2001 || Palomar || NEAT || — || align=right | 7.4 km || 
|-id=106 bgcolor=#E9E9E9
| 64106 ||  || — || October 11, 2001 || Desert Eagle || W. K. Y. Yeung || — || align=right | 2.5 km || 
|-id=107 bgcolor=#fefefe
| 64107 ||  || — || October 9, 2001 || Socorro || LINEAR || H || align=right | 1.9 km || 
|-id=108 bgcolor=#fefefe
| 64108 ||  || — || October 9, 2001 || Socorro || LINEAR || — || align=right | 3.8 km || 
|-id=109 bgcolor=#E9E9E9
| 64109 ||  || — || October 9, 2001 || Socorro || LINEAR || — || align=right | 3.3 km || 
|-id=110 bgcolor=#fefefe
| 64110 ||  || — || October 9, 2001 || Socorro || LINEAR || V || align=right | 2.5 km || 
|-id=111 bgcolor=#fefefe
| 64111 ||  || — || October 13, 2001 || Socorro || LINEAR || — || align=right | 2.1 km || 
|-id=112 bgcolor=#fefefe
| 64112 ||  || — || October 13, 2001 || Socorro || LINEAR || MAS || align=right | 1.7 km || 
|-id=113 bgcolor=#d6d6d6
| 64113 ||  || — || October 13, 2001 || Socorro || LINEAR || — || align=right | 6.7 km || 
|-id=114 bgcolor=#fefefe
| 64114 ||  || — || October 13, 2001 || Socorro || LINEAR || NYS || align=right | 1.5 km || 
|-id=115 bgcolor=#E9E9E9
| 64115 ||  || — || October 13, 2001 || Socorro || LINEAR || EUN || align=right | 4.2 km || 
|-id=116 bgcolor=#fefefe
| 64116 ||  || — || October 11, 2001 || Desert Eagle || W. K. Y. Yeung || — || align=right | 1.7 km || 
|-id=117 bgcolor=#d6d6d6
| 64117 ||  || — || October 11, 2001 || Socorro || LINEAR || — || align=right | 8.2 km || 
|-id=118 bgcolor=#d6d6d6
| 64118 ||  || — || October 13, 2001 || San Marcello || Pistoia Mountains Obs. || EOS || align=right | 6.1 km || 
|-id=119 bgcolor=#fefefe
| 64119 ||  || — || October 14, 2001 || Desert Eagle || W. K. Y. Yeung || NYS || align=right | 4.0 km || 
|-id=120 bgcolor=#fefefe
| 64120 ||  || — || October 14, 2001 || Desert Eagle || W. K. Y. Yeung || FLO || align=right | 2.8 km || 
|-id=121 bgcolor=#E9E9E9
| 64121 ||  || — || October 14, 2001 || Desert Eagle || W. K. Y. Yeung || — || align=right | 3.0 km || 
|-id=122 bgcolor=#d6d6d6
| 64122 ||  || — || October 14, 2001 || Desert Eagle || W. K. Y. Yeung || — || align=right | 6.9 km || 
|-id=123 bgcolor=#fefefe
| 64123 ||  || — || October 15, 2001 || Emerald Lane || L. Ball || NYS || align=right | 1.7 km || 
|-id=124 bgcolor=#d6d6d6
| 64124 ||  || — || October 9, 2001 || Socorro || LINEAR || — || align=right | 8.2 km || 
|-id=125 bgcolor=#fefefe
| 64125 ||  || — || October 11, 2001 || Socorro || LINEAR || — || align=right | 1.9 km || 
|-id=126 bgcolor=#d6d6d6
| 64126 ||  || — || October 13, 2001 || Socorro || LINEAR || — || align=right | 4.5 km || 
|-id=127 bgcolor=#d6d6d6
| 64127 ||  || — || October 14, 2001 || Socorro || LINEAR || KOR || align=right | 3.1 km || 
|-id=128 bgcolor=#fefefe
| 64128 ||  || — || October 14, 2001 || Socorro || LINEAR || — || align=right | 1.8 km || 
|-id=129 bgcolor=#d6d6d6
| 64129 ||  || — || October 14, 2001 || Socorro || LINEAR || — || align=right | 4.1 km || 
|-id=130 bgcolor=#d6d6d6
| 64130 ||  || — || October 14, 2001 || Socorro || LINEAR || — || align=right | 6.5 km || 
|-id=131 bgcolor=#fefefe
| 64131 ||  || — || October 14, 2001 || Socorro || LINEAR || — || align=right | 2.0 km || 
|-id=132 bgcolor=#E9E9E9
| 64132 ||  || — || October 14, 2001 || Socorro || LINEAR || MAR || align=right | 2.5 km || 
|-id=133 bgcolor=#fefefe
| 64133 ||  || — || October 14, 2001 || Socorro || LINEAR || NYS || align=right | 1.3 km || 
|-id=134 bgcolor=#fefefe
| 64134 ||  || — || October 14, 2001 || Socorro || LINEAR || V || align=right | 1.7 km || 
|-id=135 bgcolor=#E9E9E9
| 64135 ||  || — || October 14, 2001 || Socorro || LINEAR || DOR || align=right | 5.6 km || 
|-id=136 bgcolor=#E9E9E9
| 64136 ||  || — || October 14, 2001 || Socorro || LINEAR || — || align=right | 5.9 km || 
|-id=137 bgcolor=#d6d6d6
| 64137 ||  || — || October 14, 2001 || Socorro || LINEAR || EMA || align=right | 7.2 km || 
|-id=138 bgcolor=#fefefe
| 64138 ||  || — || October 14, 2001 || Socorro || LINEAR || V || align=right | 1.7 km || 
|-id=139 bgcolor=#E9E9E9
| 64139 ||  || — || October 14, 2001 || Socorro || LINEAR || — || align=right | 4.8 km || 
|-id=140 bgcolor=#fefefe
| 64140 ||  || — || October 14, 2001 || Socorro || LINEAR || — || align=right | 2.2 km || 
|-id=141 bgcolor=#fefefe
| 64141 ||  || — || October 14, 2001 || Socorro || LINEAR || — || align=right | 2.4 km || 
|-id=142 bgcolor=#fefefe
| 64142 ||  || — || October 14, 2001 || Socorro || LINEAR || — || align=right | 2.9 km || 
|-id=143 bgcolor=#fefefe
| 64143 ||  || — || October 14, 2001 || Socorro || LINEAR || — || align=right | 2.6 km || 
|-id=144 bgcolor=#E9E9E9
| 64144 ||  || — || October 14, 2001 || Socorro || LINEAR || — || align=right | 2.3 km || 
|-id=145 bgcolor=#E9E9E9
| 64145 ||  || — || October 14, 2001 || Socorro || LINEAR || — || align=right | 3.1 km || 
|-id=146 bgcolor=#fefefe
| 64146 ||  || — || October 14, 2001 || Socorro || LINEAR || — || align=right | 2.2 km || 
|-id=147 bgcolor=#E9E9E9
| 64147 ||  || — || October 14, 2001 || Socorro || LINEAR || EUN || align=right | 4.2 km || 
|-id=148 bgcolor=#fefefe
| 64148 ||  || — || October 14, 2001 || Socorro || LINEAR || V || align=right | 2.9 km || 
|-id=149 bgcolor=#fefefe
| 64149 ||  || — || October 14, 2001 || Socorro || LINEAR || FLO || align=right | 4.0 km || 
|-id=150 bgcolor=#fefefe
| 64150 ||  || — || October 14, 2001 || Socorro || LINEAR || — || align=right | 3.2 km || 
|-id=151 bgcolor=#E9E9E9
| 64151 ||  || — || October 14, 2001 || Socorro || LINEAR || GER || align=right | 3.4 km || 
|-id=152 bgcolor=#fefefe
| 64152 ||  || — || October 14, 2001 || Socorro || LINEAR || V || align=right | 2.5 km || 
|-id=153 bgcolor=#E9E9E9
| 64153 ||  || — || October 14, 2001 || Socorro || LINEAR || EUN || align=right | 3.5 km || 
|-id=154 bgcolor=#fefefe
| 64154 ||  || — || October 14, 2001 || Socorro || LINEAR || FLO || align=right | 1.9 km || 
|-id=155 bgcolor=#E9E9E9
| 64155 ||  || — || October 14, 2001 || Socorro || LINEAR || GEF || align=right | 3.1 km || 
|-id=156 bgcolor=#E9E9E9
| 64156 ||  || — || October 14, 2001 || Socorro || LINEAR || — || align=right | 7.1 km || 
|-id=157 bgcolor=#E9E9E9
| 64157 ||  || — || October 14, 2001 || Socorro || LINEAR || — || align=right | 4.8 km || 
|-id=158 bgcolor=#d6d6d6
| 64158 ||  || — || October 14, 2001 || Socorro || LINEAR || — || align=right | 6.3 km || 
|-id=159 bgcolor=#E9E9E9
| 64159 ||  || — || October 14, 2001 || Socorro || LINEAR || — || align=right | 6.9 km || 
|-id=160 bgcolor=#E9E9E9
| 64160 ||  || — || October 14, 2001 || Socorro || LINEAR || EUN || align=right | 4.1 km || 
|-id=161 bgcolor=#E9E9E9
| 64161 ||  || — || October 14, 2001 || Needville || Needville Obs. || — || align=right | 3.4 km || 
|-id=162 bgcolor=#d6d6d6
| 64162 ||  || — || October 9, 2001 || Kitt Peak || Spacewatch || — || align=right | 4.4 km || 
|-id=163 bgcolor=#fefefe
| 64163 ||  || — || October 15, 2001 || Socorro || LINEAR || — || align=right | 3.3 km || 
|-id=164 bgcolor=#fefefe
| 64164 ||  || — || October 15, 2001 || Desert Eagle || W. K. Y. Yeung || V || align=right | 1.6 km || 
|-id=165 bgcolor=#d6d6d6
| 64165 ||  || — || October 13, 2001 || Socorro || LINEAR || KAR || align=right | 2.6 km || 
|-id=166 bgcolor=#E9E9E9
| 64166 ||  || — || October 13, 2001 || Socorro || LINEAR || — || align=right | 2.7 km || 
|-id=167 bgcolor=#fefefe
| 64167 ||  || — || October 13, 2001 || Socorro || LINEAR || — || align=right | 1.5 km || 
|-id=168 bgcolor=#fefefe
| 64168 ||  || — || October 13, 2001 || Socorro || LINEAR || NYS || align=right | 1.5 km || 
|-id=169 bgcolor=#d6d6d6
| 64169 ||  || — || October 13, 2001 || Socorro || LINEAR || — || align=right | 4.3 km || 
|-id=170 bgcolor=#E9E9E9
| 64170 ||  || — || October 15, 2001 || Socorro || LINEAR || — || align=right | 3.5 km || 
|-id=171 bgcolor=#fefefe
| 64171 ||  || — || October 14, 2001 || Desert Eagle || W. K. Y. Yeung || MAS || align=right | 1.7 km || 
|-id=172 bgcolor=#d6d6d6
| 64172 ||  || — || October 13, 2001 || Socorro || LINEAR || KOR || align=right | 2.7 km || 
|-id=173 bgcolor=#E9E9E9
| 64173 ||  || — || October 13, 2001 || Socorro || LINEAR || — || align=right | 1.9 km || 
|-id=174 bgcolor=#d6d6d6
| 64174 ||  || — || October 13, 2001 || Socorro || LINEAR || — || align=right | 4.1 km || 
|-id=175 bgcolor=#E9E9E9
| 64175 ||  || — || October 13, 2001 || Socorro || LINEAR || — || align=right | 3.7 km || 
|-id=176 bgcolor=#E9E9E9
| 64176 ||  || — || October 13, 2001 || Socorro || LINEAR || — || align=right | 4.1 km || 
|-id=177 bgcolor=#fefefe
| 64177 ||  || — || October 13, 2001 || Socorro || LINEAR || V || align=right | 1.6 km || 
|-id=178 bgcolor=#fefefe
| 64178 ||  || — || October 13, 2001 || Socorro || LINEAR || NYS || align=right | 1.6 km || 
|-id=179 bgcolor=#d6d6d6
| 64179 ||  || — || October 13, 2001 || Socorro || LINEAR || — || align=right | 5.8 km || 
|-id=180 bgcolor=#fefefe
| 64180 ||  || — || October 13, 2001 || Socorro || LINEAR || FLO || align=right | 1.8 km || 
|-id=181 bgcolor=#fefefe
| 64181 ||  || — || October 13, 2001 || Socorro || LINEAR || — || align=right | 2.2 km || 
|-id=182 bgcolor=#d6d6d6
| 64182 ||  || — || October 13, 2001 || Socorro || LINEAR || — || align=right | 4.8 km || 
|-id=183 bgcolor=#E9E9E9
| 64183 ||  || — || October 13, 2001 || Socorro || LINEAR || — || align=right | 3.5 km || 
|-id=184 bgcolor=#E9E9E9
| 64184 ||  || — || October 13, 2001 || Socorro || LINEAR || — || align=right | 2.0 km || 
|-id=185 bgcolor=#fefefe
| 64185 ||  || — || October 13, 2001 || Socorro || LINEAR || — || align=right | 1.9 km || 
|-id=186 bgcolor=#d6d6d6
| 64186 ||  || — || October 13, 2001 || Socorro || LINEAR || — || align=right | 3.3 km || 
|-id=187 bgcolor=#fefefe
| 64187 ||  || — || October 13, 2001 || Socorro || LINEAR || — || align=right | 2.0 km || 
|-id=188 bgcolor=#fefefe
| 64188 ||  || — || October 13, 2001 || Socorro || LINEAR || NYS || align=right | 1.9 km || 
|-id=189 bgcolor=#fefefe
| 64189 ||  || — || October 13, 2001 || Socorro || LINEAR || MAS || align=right | 1.5 km || 
|-id=190 bgcolor=#fefefe
| 64190 ||  || — || October 13, 2001 || Socorro || LINEAR || NYS || align=right | 1.5 km || 
|-id=191 bgcolor=#d6d6d6
| 64191 ||  || — || October 13, 2001 || Socorro || LINEAR || KOR || align=right | 2.8 km || 
|-id=192 bgcolor=#fefefe
| 64192 ||  || — || October 13, 2001 || Socorro || LINEAR || FLO || align=right | 1.9 km || 
|-id=193 bgcolor=#fefefe
| 64193 ||  || — || October 13, 2001 || Socorro || LINEAR || — || align=right | 2.1 km || 
|-id=194 bgcolor=#fefefe
| 64194 ||  || — || October 13, 2001 || Socorro || LINEAR || FLO || align=right | 2.2 km || 
|-id=195 bgcolor=#E9E9E9
| 64195 ||  || — || October 13, 2001 || Socorro || LINEAR || — || align=right | 2.5 km || 
|-id=196 bgcolor=#d6d6d6
| 64196 ||  || — || October 13, 2001 || Socorro || LINEAR || KOR || align=right | 3.0 km || 
|-id=197 bgcolor=#fefefe
| 64197 ||  || — || October 13, 2001 || Socorro || LINEAR || MAS || align=right | 1.7 km || 
|-id=198 bgcolor=#E9E9E9
| 64198 ||  || — || October 13, 2001 || Socorro || LINEAR || — || align=right | 2.5 km || 
|-id=199 bgcolor=#fefefe
| 64199 ||  || — || October 13, 2001 || Socorro || LINEAR || — || align=right | 2.1 km || 
|-id=200 bgcolor=#E9E9E9
| 64200 ||  || — || October 13, 2001 || Socorro || LINEAR || — || align=right | 5.6 km || 
|}

64201–64300 

|-bgcolor=#fefefe
| 64201 ||  || — || October 13, 2001 || Socorro || LINEAR || V || align=right | 2.6 km || 
|-id=202 bgcolor=#d6d6d6
| 64202 ||  || — || October 14, 2001 || Socorro || LINEAR || HYG || align=right | 6.6 km || 
|-id=203 bgcolor=#E9E9E9
| 64203 ||  || — || October 14, 2001 || Socorro || LINEAR || — || align=right | 2.3 km || 
|-id=204 bgcolor=#E9E9E9
| 64204 ||  || — || October 14, 2001 || Socorro || LINEAR || — || align=right | 5.9 km || 
|-id=205 bgcolor=#fefefe
| 64205 ||  || — || October 14, 2001 || Socorro || LINEAR || — || align=right | 2.4 km || 
|-id=206 bgcolor=#E9E9E9
| 64206 ||  || — || October 14, 2001 || Socorro || LINEAR || — || align=right | 3.4 km || 
|-id=207 bgcolor=#fefefe
| 64207 ||  || — || October 14, 2001 || Socorro || LINEAR || — || align=right | 2.0 km || 
|-id=208 bgcolor=#fefefe
| 64208 ||  || — || October 14, 2001 || Socorro || LINEAR || — || align=right | 1.7 km || 
|-id=209 bgcolor=#E9E9E9
| 64209 ||  || — || October 14, 2001 || Socorro || LINEAR || HOF || align=right | 5.3 km || 
|-id=210 bgcolor=#fefefe
| 64210 ||  || — || October 15, 2001 || Desert Eagle || W. K. Y. Yeung || V || align=right | 1.6 km || 
|-id=211 bgcolor=#fefefe
| 64211 ||  || — || October 13, 2001 || Socorro || LINEAR || — || align=right | 1.8 km || 
|-id=212 bgcolor=#fefefe
| 64212 ||  || — || October 13, 2001 || Socorro || LINEAR || FLO || align=right | 2.2 km || 
|-id=213 bgcolor=#fefefe
| 64213 ||  || — || October 13, 2001 || Socorro || LINEAR || V || align=right | 2.7 km || 
|-id=214 bgcolor=#fefefe
| 64214 ||  || — || October 13, 2001 || Socorro || LINEAR || — || align=right | 5.2 km || 
|-id=215 bgcolor=#E9E9E9
| 64215 ||  || — || October 13, 2001 || Socorro || LINEAR || EUN || align=right | 6.6 km || 
|-id=216 bgcolor=#E9E9E9
| 64216 ||  || — || October 13, 2001 || Socorro || LINEAR || — || align=right | 4.9 km || 
|-id=217 bgcolor=#d6d6d6
| 64217 ||  || — || October 13, 2001 || Socorro || LINEAR || — || align=right | 7.7 km || 
|-id=218 bgcolor=#E9E9E9
| 64218 ||  || — || October 13, 2001 || Socorro || LINEAR || EUN || align=right | 3.2 km || 
|-id=219 bgcolor=#E9E9E9
| 64219 ||  || — || October 13, 2001 || Socorro || LINEAR || GEF || align=right | 4.0 km || 
|-id=220 bgcolor=#E9E9E9
| 64220 ||  || — || October 13, 2001 || Socorro || LINEAR || — || align=right | 8.8 km || 
|-id=221 bgcolor=#d6d6d6
| 64221 ||  || — || October 14, 2001 || Socorro || LINEAR || — || align=right | 8.8 km || 
|-id=222 bgcolor=#fefefe
| 64222 ||  || — || October 14, 2001 || Socorro || LINEAR || FLO || align=right | 1.0 km || 
|-id=223 bgcolor=#fefefe
| 64223 ||  || — || October 14, 2001 || Socorro || LINEAR || — || align=right | 2.0 km || 
|-id=224 bgcolor=#fefefe
| 64224 ||  || — || October 14, 2001 || Socorro || LINEAR || — || align=right | 1.8 km || 
|-id=225 bgcolor=#E9E9E9
| 64225 ||  || — || October 14, 2001 || Socorro || LINEAR || — || align=right | 2.8 km || 
|-id=226 bgcolor=#E9E9E9
| 64226 ||  || — || October 14, 2001 || Socorro || LINEAR || DOR || align=right | 6.8 km || 
|-id=227 bgcolor=#E9E9E9
| 64227 ||  || — || October 14, 2001 || Socorro || LINEAR || — || align=right | 3.0 km || 
|-id=228 bgcolor=#fefefe
| 64228 ||  || — || October 14, 2001 || Socorro || LINEAR || — || align=right | 3.9 km || 
|-id=229 bgcolor=#E9E9E9
| 64229 ||  || — || October 14, 2001 || Socorro || LINEAR || — || align=right | 3.8 km || 
|-id=230 bgcolor=#E9E9E9
| 64230 ||  || — || October 14, 2001 || Socorro || LINEAR || — || align=right | 3.7 km || 
|-id=231 bgcolor=#E9E9E9
| 64231 ||  || — || October 14, 2001 || Socorro || LINEAR || — || align=right | 3.6 km || 
|-id=232 bgcolor=#E9E9E9
| 64232 ||  || — || October 15, 2001 || Socorro || LINEAR || — || align=right | 5.3 km || 
|-id=233 bgcolor=#d6d6d6
| 64233 ||  || — || October 12, 2001 || Haleakala || NEAT || EOS || align=right | 4.8 km || 
|-id=234 bgcolor=#fefefe
| 64234 ||  || — || October 12, 2001 || Haleakala || NEAT || V || align=right | 1.5 km || 
|-id=235 bgcolor=#fefefe
| 64235 ||  || — || October 10, 2001 || Palomar || NEAT || — || align=right | 1.8 km || 
|-id=236 bgcolor=#fefefe
| 64236 ||  || — || October 14, 2001 || Kitt Peak || Spacewatch || — || align=right | 2.2 km || 
|-id=237 bgcolor=#fefefe
| 64237 ||  || — || October 12, 2001 || Haleakala || NEAT || V || align=right | 1.3 km || 
|-id=238 bgcolor=#d6d6d6
| 64238 ||  || — || October 12, 2001 || Haleakala || NEAT || NAE || align=right | 6.2 km || 
|-id=239 bgcolor=#d6d6d6
| 64239 ||  || — || October 14, 2001 || Palomar || NEAT || — || align=right | 5.6 km || 
|-id=240 bgcolor=#d6d6d6
| 64240 ||  || — || October 14, 2001 || Palomar || NEAT || — || align=right | 7.1 km || 
|-id=241 bgcolor=#E9E9E9
| 64241 ||  || — || October 10, 2001 || Palomar || NEAT || — || align=right | 2.5 km || 
|-id=242 bgcolor=#fefefe
| 64242 ||  || — || October 10, 2001 || Palomar || NEAT || — || align=right | 1.6 km || 
|-id=243 bgcolor=#fefefe
| 64243 ||  || — || October 10, 2001 || Palomar || NEAT || — || align=right | 2.1 km || 
|-id=244 bgcolor=#d6d6d6
| 64244 ||  || — || October 10, 2001 || Palomar || NEAT || — || align=right | 6.1 km || 
|-id=245 bgcolor=#E9E9E9
| 64245 ||  || — || October 12, 2001 || Haleakala || NEAT || — || align=right | 5.8 km || 
|-id=246 bgcolor=#d6d6d6
| 64246 ||  || — || October 15, 2001 || Palomar || NEAT || EOS || align=right | 5.6 km || 
|-id=247 bgcolor=#fefefe
| 64247 ||  || — || October 11, 2001 || Palomar || NEAT || — || align=right | 2.1 km || 
|-id=248 bgcolor=#d6d6d6
| 64248 ||  || — || October 15, 2001 || Palomar || NEAT || EOS || align=right | 5.9 km || 
|-id=249 bgcolor=#d6d6d6
| 64249 ||  || — || October 15, 2001 || Socorro || LINEAR || EOS || align=right | 4.5 km || 
|-id=250 bgcolor=#fefefe
| 64250 ||  || — || October 15, 2001 || Socorro || LINEAR || V || align=right | 1.7 km || 
|-id=251 bgcolor=#E9E9E9
| 64251 ||  || — || October 15, 2001 || Socorro || LINEAR || — || align=right | 3.1 km || 
|-id=252 bgcolor=#fefefe
| 64252 ||  || — || October 15, 2001 || Socorro || LINEAR || — || align=right | 2.3 km || 
|-id=253 bgcolor=#fefefe
| 64253 ||  || — || October 15, 2001 || Socorro || LINEAR || — || align=right | 2.3 km || 
|-id=254 bgcolor=#fefefe
| 64254 ||  || — || October 15, 2001 || Socorro || LINEAR || H || align=right | 1.3 km || 
|-id=255 bgcolor=#fefefe
| 64255 ||  || — || October 13, 2001 || Palomar || NEAT || — || align=right | 3.0 km || 
|-id=256 bgcolor=#fefefe
| 64256 ||  || — || October 15, 2001 || Palomar || NEAT || — || align=right | 2.1 km || 
|-id=257 bgcolor=#E9E9E9
| 64257 ||  || — || October 14, 2001 || Socorro || LINEAR || — || align=right | 3.3 km || 
|-id=258 bgcolor=#fefefe
| 64258 ||  || — || October 14, 2001 || Socorro || LINEAR || V || align=right | 1.8 km || 
|-id=259 bgcolor=#d6d6d6
| 64259 ||  || — || October 14, 2001 || Socorro || LINEAR || — || align=right | 6.3 km || 
|-id=260 bgcolor=#fefefe
| 64260 ||  || — || October 14, 2001 || Socorro || LINEAR || — || align=right | 1.6 km || 
|-id=261 bgcolor=#fefefe
| 64261 ||  || — || October 14, 2001 || Socorro || LINEAR || — || align=right | 1.9 km || 
|-id=262 bgcolor=#fefefe
| 64262 ||  || — || October 14, 2001 || Socorro || LINEAR || — || align=right | 1.8 km || 
|-id=263 bgcolor=#E9E9E9
| 64263 ||  || — || October 14, 2001 || Socorro || LINEAR || CLO || align=right | 5.7 km || 
|-id=264 bgcolor=#E9E9E9
| 64264 ||  || — || October 14, 2001 || Socorro || LINEAR || — || align=right | 4.9 km || 
|-id=265 bgcolor=#fefefe
| 64265 ||  || — || October 14, 2001 || Socorro || LINEAR || FLO || align=right | 2.3 km || 
|-id=266 bgcolor=#fefefe
| 64266 ||  || — || October 14, 2001 || Socorro || LINEAR || — || align=right | 3.0 km || 
|-id=267 bgcolor=#fefefe
| 64267 ||  || — || October 15, 2001 || Socorro || LINEAR || H || align=right | 2.1 km || 
|-id=268 bgcolor=#E9E9E9
| 64268 ||  || — || October 15, 2001 || Socorro || LINEAR || HEN || align=right | 1.8 km || 
|-id=269 bgcolor=#E9E9E9
| 64269 ||  || — || October 15, 2001 || Palomar || NEAT || — || align=right | 2.8 km || 
|-id=270 bgcolor=#C2FFFF
| 64270 ||  || — || October 15, 2001 || Palomar || NEAT || L5 || align=right | 16 km || 
|-id=271 bgcolor=#d6d6d6
| 64271 ||  || — || October 11, 2001 || Socorro || LINEAR || EOS || align=right | 4.8 km || 
|-id=272 bgcolor=#d6d6d6
| 64272 ||  || — || October 11, 2001 || Socorro || LINEAR || — || align=right | 5.6 km || 
|-id=273 bgcolor=#E9E9E9
| 64273 ||  || — || October 11, 2001 || Socorro || LINEAR || BAR || align=right | 2.8 km || 
|-id=274 bgcolor=#d6d6d6
| 64274 ||  || — || October 12, 2001 || Haleakala || NEAT || — || align=right | 4.9 km || 
|-id=275 bgcolor=#E9E9E9
| 64275 ||  || — || October 13, 2001 || Anderson Mesa || LONEOS || — || align=right | 3.8 km || 
|-id=276 bgcolor=#fefefe
| 64276 ||  || — || October 14, 2001 || Anderson Mesa || LONEOS || — || align=right | 1.5 km || 
|-id=277 bgcolor=#fefefe
| 64277 ||  || — || October 14, 2001 || Socorro || LINEAR || — || align=right | 1.9 km || 
|-id=278 bgcolor=#E9E9E9
| 64278 ||  || — || October 14, 2001 || Anderson Mesa || LONEOS || — || align=right | 3.9 km || 
|-id=279 bgcolor=#d6d6d6
| 64279 ||  || — || October 15, 2001 || Palomar || NEAT || — || align=right | 7.4 km || 
|-id=280 bgcolor=#fefefe
| 64280 ||  || — || October 15, 2001 || Palomar || NEAT || — || align=right | 1.7 km || 
|-id=281 bgcolor=#fefefe
| 64281 ||  || — || October 8, 2001 || Palomar || NEAT || — || align=right | 3.3 km || 
|-id=282 bgcolor=#E9E9E9
| 64282 ||  || — || October 21, 2001 || Desert Eagle || W. K. Y. Yeung || — || align=right | 4.8 km || 
|-id=283 bgcolor=#fefefe
| 64283 ||  || — || October 21, 2001 || Desert Eagle || W. K. Y. Yeung || — || align=right | 2.3 km || 
|-id=284 bgcolor=#E9E9E9
| 64284 ||  || — || October 20, 2001 || Ametlla de Mar || J. Nomen || — || align=right | 4.1 km || 
|-id=285 bgcolor=#E9E9E9
| 64285 ||  || — || October 17, 2001 || Desert Eagle || W. K. Y. Yeung || HEN || align=right | 2.6 km || 
|-id=286 bgcolor=#E9E9E9
| 64286 ||  || — || October 17, 2001 || Socorro || LINEAR || — || align=right | 3.3 km || 
|-id=287 bgcolor=#E9E9E9
| 64287 ||  || — || October 17, 2001 || Socorro || LINEAR || GEF || align=right | 3.7 km || 
|-id=288 bgcolor=#fefefe
| 64288 Lamchiuying ||  ||  || October 18, 2001 || Desert Eagle || W. K. Y. Yeung || NYS || align=right | 1.6 km || 
|-id=289 bgcolor=#E9E9E9
| 64289 Shihwingching ||  ||  || October 22, 2001 || Desert Eagle || W. K. Y. Yeung || — || align=right | 4.0 km || 
|-id=290 bgcolor=#d6d6d6
| 64290 Yaushingtung ||  ||  || October 22, 2001 || Desert Eagle || W. K. Y. Yeung || HYG || align=right | 5.3 km || 
|-id=291 bgcolor=#E9E9E9
| 64291 Anglee ||  ||  || October 23, 2001 || Desert Eagle || W. K. Y. Yeung || — || align=right | 4.6 km || 
|-id=292 bgcolor=#E9E9E9
| 64292 ||  || — || October 24, 2001 || Desert Eagle || W. K. Y. Yeung || NEM || align=right | 4.9 km || 
|-id=293 bgcolor=#E9E9E9
| 64293 ||  || — || October 24, 2001 || Desert Eagle || W. K. Y. Yeung || — || align=right | 3.0 km || 
|-id=294 bgcolor=#d6d6d6
| 64294 ||  || — || October 24, 2001 || Desert Eagle || W. K. Y. Yeung || — || align=right | 6.3 km || 
|-id=295 bgcolor=#fefefe
| 64295 Tangtisheng ||  ||  || October 24, 2001 || Desert Eagle || W. K. Y. Yeung || — || align=right | 2.1 km || 
|-id=296 bgcolor=#fefefe
| 64296 Hokoon ||  ||  || October 24, 2001 || Desert Eagle || W. K. Y. Yeung || V || align=right | 2.3 km || 
|-id=297 bgcolor=#fefefe
| 64297 ||  || — || October 17, 2001 || Bergisch Gladbach || W. Bickel || V || align=right | 1.6 km || 
|-id=298 bgcolor=#E9E9E9
| 64298 ||  || — || October 24, 2001 || Desert Eagle || W. K. Y. Yeung || — || align=right | 3.3 km || 
|-id=299 bgcolor=#E9E9E9
| 64299 ||  || — || October 24, 2001 || Desert Eagle || W. K. Y. Yeung || — || align=right | 2.6 km || 
|-id=300 bgcolor=#E9E9E9
| 64300 ||  || — || October 25, 2001 || Desert Eagle || W. K. Y. Yeung || — || align=right | 4.1 km || 
|}

64301–64400 

|-bgcolor=#fefefe
| 64301 ||  || — || October 16, 2001 || Palomar || NEAT || — || align=right | 1.7 km || 
|-id=302 bgcolor=#d6d6d6
| 64302 ||  || — || October 17, 2001 || Socorro || LINEAR || EOS || align=right | 5.4 km || 
|-id=303 bgcolor=#d6d6d6
| 64303 ||  || — || October 18, 2001 || Socorro || LINEAR || — || align=right | 7.3 km || 
|-id=304 bgcolor=#E9E9E9
| 64304 ||  || — || October 18, 2001 || Socorro || LINEAR || MAR || align=right | 3.4 km || 
|-id=305 bgcolor=#E9E9E9
| 64305 ||  || — || October 16, 2001 || Haleakala || NEAT || — || align=right | 2.6 km || 
|-id=306 bgcolor=#d6d6d6
| 64306 ||  || — || October 16, 2001 || Socorro || LINEAR || — || align=right | 8.0 km || 
|-id=307 bgcolor=#d6d6d6
| 64307 ||  || — || October 16, 2001 || Socorro || LINEAR || — || align=right | 9.4 km || 
|-id=308 bgcolor=#fefefe
| 64308 ||  || — || October 16, 2001 || Socorro || LINEAR || — || align=right | 2.0 km || 
|-id=309 bgcolor=#d6d6d6
| 64309 ||  || — || October 16, 2001 || Socorro || LINEAR || EOS || align=right | 5.4 km || 
|-id=310 bgcolor=#fefefe
| 64310 ||  || — || October 16, 2001 || Socorro || LINEAR || FLO || align=right | 1.1 km || 
|-id=311 bgcolor=#fefefe
| 64311 ||  || — || October 16, 2001 || Socorro || LINEAR || V || align=right | 2.1 km || 
|-id=312 bgcolor=#fefefe
| 64312 ||  || — || October 16, 2001 || Socorro || LINEAR || FLO || align=right | 1.1 km || 
|-id=313 bgcolor=#E9E9E9
| 64313 ||  || — || October 16, 2001 || Socorro || LINEAR || — || align=right | 3.6 km || 
|-id=314 bgcolor=#fefefe
| 64314 ||  || — || October 16, 2001 || Socorro || LINEAR || — || align=right | 2.6 km || 
|-id=315 bgcolor=#fefefe
| 64315 ||  || — || October 16, 2001 || Socorro || LINEAR || — || align=right | 2.2 km || 
|-id=316 bgcolor=#fefefe
| 64316 ||  || — || October 16, 2001 || Socorro || LINEAR || — || align=right | 1.7 km || 
|-id=317 bgcolor=#E9E9E9
| 64317 ||  || — || October 16, 2001 || Socorro || LINEAR || — || align=right | 5.7 km || 
|-id=318 bgcolor=#fefefe
| 64318 ||  || — || October 16, 2001 || Socorro || LINEAR || V || align=right | 1.4 km || 
|-id=319 bgcolor=#fefefe
| 64319 ||  || — || October 17, 2001 || Socorro || LINEAR || — || align=right | 1.6 km || 
|-id=320 bgcolor=#fefefe
| 64320 ||  || — || October 17, 2001 || Socorro || LINEAR || — || align=right | 2.1 km || 
|-id=321 bgcolor=#E9E9E9
| 64321 ||  || — || October 17, 2001 || Socorro || LINEAR || — || align=right | 2.9 km || 
|-id=322 bgcolor=#fefefe
| 64322 ||  || — || October 17, 2001 || Socorro || LINEAR || FLO || align=right | 1.9 km || 
|-id=323 bgcolor=#fefefe
| 64323 ||  || — || October 17, 2001 || Socorro || LINEAR || FLO || align=right | 1.3 km || 
|-id=324 bgcolor=#d6d6d6
| 64324 ||  || — || October 17, 2001 || Socorro || LINEAR || — || align=right | 4.7 km || 
|-id=325 bgcolor=#fefefe
| 64325 ||  || — || October 17, 2001 || Socorro || LINEAR || NYS || align=right | 1.2 km || 
|-id=326 bgcolor=#C2FFFF
| 64326 ||  || — || October 17, 2001 || Socorro || LINEAR || L5 || align=right | 15 km || 
|-id=327 bgcolor=#d6d6d6
| 64327 ||  || — || October 17, 2001 || Socorro || LINEAR || KOR || align=right | 3.6 km || 
|-id=328 bgcolor=#E9E9E9
| 64328 ||  || — || October 17, 2001 || Socorro || LINEAR || — || align=right | 2.3 km || 
|-id=329 bgcolor=#fefefe
| 64329 ||  || — || October 17, 2001 || Socorro || LINEAR || — || align=right | 4.2 km || 
|-id=330 bgcolor=#E9E9E9
| 64330 ||  || — || October 17, 2001 || Socorro || LINEAR || — || align=right | 3.9 km || 
|-id=331 bgcolor=#fefefe
| 64331 ||  || — || October 17, 2001 || Socorro || LINEAR || V || align=right | 1.7 km || 
|-id=332 bgcolor=#E9E9E9
| 64332 ||  || — || October 17, 2001 || Socorro || LINEAR || HEN || align=right | 2.2 km || 
|-id=333 bgcolor=#d6d6d6
| 64333 ||  || — || October 17, 2001 || Socorro || LINEAR || 628 || align=right | 3.7 km || 
|-id=334 bgcolor=#fefefe
| 64334 ||  || — || October 17, 2001 || Socorro || LINEAR || MAS || align=right | 1.6 km || 
|-id=335 bgcolor=#fefefe
| 64335 ||  || — || October 17, 2001 || Socorro || LINEAR || — || align=right | 1.6 km || 
|-id=336 bgcolor=#d6d6d6
| 64336 ||  || — || October 17, 2001 || Socorro || LINEAR || — || align=right | 7.7 km || 
|-id=337 bgcolor=#fefefe
| 64337 ||  || — || October 17, 2001 || Socorro || LINEAR || — || align=right | 1.7 km || 
|-id=338 bgcolor=#fefefe
| 64338 ||  || — || October 18, 2001 || Socorro || LINEAR || — || align=right | 2.6 km || 
|-id=339 bgcolor=#E9E9E9
| 64339 ||  || — || October 20, 2001 || Haleakala || NEAT || — || align=right | 5.2 km || 
|-id=340 bgcolor=#E9E9E9
| 64340 ||  || — || October 16, 2001 || Socorro || LINEAR || — || align=right | 3.1 km || 
|-id=341 bgcolor=#fefefe
| 64341 ||  || — || October 16, 2001 || Socorro || LINEAR || — || align=right | 1.6 km || 
|-id=342 bgcolor=#fefefe
| 64342 ||  || — || October 17, 2001 || Socorro || LINEAR || — || align=right | 1.8 km || 
|-id=343 bgcolor=#E9E9E9
| 64343 ||  || — || October 17, 2001 || Socorro || LINEAR || — || align=right | 4.2 km || 
|-id=344 bgcolor=#E9E9E9
| 64344 ||  || — || October 17, 2001 || Socorro || LINEAR || MIS || align=right | 6.3 km || 
|-id=345 bgcolor=#d6d6d6
| 64345 ||  || — || October 18, 2001 || Socorro || LINEAR || — || align=right | 5.3 km || 
|-id=346 bgcolor=#fefefe
| 64346 ||  || — || October 20, 2001 || Socorro || LINEAR || FLO || align=right | 1.1 km || 
|-id=347 bgcolor=#fefefe
| 64347 ||  || — || October 20, 2001 || Socorro || LINEAR || FLO || align=right | 1.9 km || 
|-id=348 bgcolor=#d6d6d6
| 64348 ||  || — || October 20, 2001 || Socorro || LINEAR || — || align=right | 7.0 km || 
|-id=349 bgcolor=#E9E9E9
| 64349 ||  || — || October 20, 2001 || Socorro || LINEAR || — || align=right | 4.7 km || 
|-id=350 bgcolor=#d6d6d6
| 64350 ||  || — || October 20, 2001 || Socorro || LINEAR || — || align=right | 4.6 km || 
|-id=351 bgcolor=#fefefe
| 64351 ||  || — || October 20, 2001 || Socorro || LINEAR || — || align=right | 2.5 km || 
|-id=352 bgcolor=#E9E9E9
| 64352 ||  || — || October 20, 2001 || Socorro || LINEAR || — || align=right | 2.7 km || 
|-id=353 bgcolor=#d6d6d6
| 64353 ||  || — || October 20, 2001 || Socorro || LINEAR || — || align=right | 5.9 km || 
|-id=354 bgcolor=#E9E9E9
| 64354 ||  || — || October 20, 2001 || Socorro || LINEAR || — || align=right | 5.4 km || 
|-id=355 bgcolor=#fefefe
| 64355 ||  || — || October 21, 2001 || Socorro || LINEAR || — || align=right | 2.1 km || 
|-id=356 bgcolor=#d6d6d6
| 64356 ||  || — || October 18, 2001 || Kitt Peak || Spacewatch || KOR || align=right | 3.3 km || 
|-id=357 bgcolor=#E9E9E9
| 64357 ||  || — || October 22, 2001 || Palomar || NEAT || — || align=right | 4.4 km || 
|-id=358 bgcolor=#d6d6d6
| 64358 ||  || — || October 18, 2001 || Palomar || NEAT || — || align=right | 5.8 km || 
|-id=359 bgcolor=#fefefe
| 64359 ||  || — || October 19, 2001 || Haleakala || NEAT || — || align=right | 3.3 km || 
|-id=360 bgcolor=#fefefe
| 64360 ||  || — || October 17, 2001 || Socorro || LINEAR || — || align=right | 1.8 km || 
|-id=361 bgcolor=#fefefe
| 64361 ||  || — || October 17, 2001 || Socorro || LINEAR || — || align=right | 3.0 km || 
|-id=362 bgcolor=#fefefe
| 64362 ||  || — || October 17, 2001 || Socorro || LINEAR || — || align=right | 2.0 km || 
|-id=363 bgcolor=#fefefe
| 64363 ||  || — || October 17, 2001 || Socorro || LINEAR || — || align=right | 1.5 km || 
|-id=364 bgcolor=#fefefe
| 64364 ||  || — || October 20, 2001 || Socorro || LINEAR || NYS || align=right | 1.2 km || 
|-id=365 bgcolor=#E9E9E9
| 64365 ||  || — || October 20, 2001 || Socorro || LINEAR || — || align=right | 2.3 km || 
|-id=366 bgcolor=#fefefe
| 64366 ||  || — || October 20, 2001 || Socorro || LINEAR || — || align=right | 3.7 km || 
|-id=367 bgcolor=#d6d6d6
| 64367 ||  || — || October 20, 2001 || Socorro || LINEAR || — || align=right | 5.3 km || 
|-id=368 bgcolor=#E9E9E9
| 64368 ||  || — || October 20, 2001 || Socorro || LINEAR || HEN || align=right | 2.4 km || 
|-id=369 bgcolor=#fefefe
| 64369 ||  || — || October 21, 2001 || Socorro || LINEAR || MAS || align=right | 1.1 km || 
|-id=370 bgcolor=#E9E9E9
| 64370 ||  || — || October 21, 2001 || Socorro || LINEAR || — || align=right | 4.8 km || 
|-id=371 bgcolor=#d6d6d6
| 64371 ||  || — || October 21, 2001 || Socorro || LINEAR || KOR || align=right | 5.0 km || 
|-id=372 bgcolor=#fefefe
| 64372 ||  || — || October 22, 2001 || Socorro || LINEAR || EUT || align=right | 2.2 km || 
|-id=373 bgcolor=#E9E9E9
| 64373 ||  || — || October 22, 2001 || Socorro || LINEAR || — || align=right | 4.9 km || 
|-id=374 bgcolor=#fefefe
| 64374 ||  || — || October 22, 2001 || Socorro || LINEAR || SUL || align=right | 4.0 km || 
|-id=375 bgcolor=#d6d6d6
| 64375 ||  || — || October 22, 2001 || Socorro || LINEAR || KOR || align=right | 3.0 km || 
|-id=376 bgcolor=#E9E9E9
| 64376 ||  || — || October 22, 2001 || Socorro || LINEAR || — || align=right | 2.0 km || 
|-id=377 bgcolor=#fefefe
| 64377 ||  || — || October 22, 2001 || Socorro || LINEAR || FLO || align=right | 1.8 km || 
|-id=378 bgcolor=#d6d6d6
| 64378 ||  || — || October 22, 2001 || Socorro || LINEAR || — || align=right | 4.9 km || 
|-id=379 bgcolor=#d6d6d6
| 64379 ||  || — || October 22, 2001 || Socorro || LINEAR || — || align=right | 5.9 km || 
|-id=380 bgcolor=#fefefe
| 64380 ||  || — || October 17, 2001 || Socorro || LINEAR || — || align=right | 1.9 km || 
|-id=381 bgcolor=#fefefe
| 64381 ||  || — || October 20, 2001 || Socorro || LINEAR || NYS || align=right | 1.2 km || 
|-id=382 bgcolor=#fefefe
| 64382 ||  || — || October 20, 2001 || Socorro || LINEAR || — || align=right | 3.3 km || 
|-id=383 bgcolor=#fefefe
| 64383 ||  || — || October 20, 2001 || Socorro || LINEAR || NYS || align=right | 2.1 km || 
|-id=384 bgcolor=#fefefe
| 64384 ||  || — || October 20, 2001 || Socorro || LINEAR || — || align=right | 1.9 km || 
|-id=385 bgcolor=#E9E9E9
| 64385 ||  || — || October 22, 2001 || Socorro || LINEAR || — || align=right | 3.6 km || 
|-id=386 bgcolor=#d6d6d6
| 64386 ||  || — || October 23, 2001 || Socorro || LINEAR || — || align=right | 4.0 km || 
|-id=387 bgcolor=#fefefe
| 64387 ||  || — || October 23, 2001 || Socorro || LINEAR || MAS || align=right | 2.1 km || 
|-id=388 bgcolor=#fefefe
| 64388 ||  || — || October 23, 2001 || Socorro || LINEAR || V || align=right | 1.1 km || 
|-id=389 bgcolor=#fefefe
| 64389 ||  || — || October 23, 2001 || Socorro || LINEAR || FLO || align=right | 1.7 km || 
|-id=390 bgcolor=#d6d6d6
| 64390 ||  || — || October 23, 2001 || Socorro || LINEAR || 3:2 || align=right | 6.6 km || 
|-id=391 bgcolor=#fefefe
| 64391 ||  || — || October 23, 2001 || Socorro || LINEAR || — || align=right | 1.7 km || 
|-id=392 bgcolor=#E9E9E9
| 64392 ||  || — || October 23, 2001 || Socorro || LINEAR || — || align=right | 3.3 km || 
|-id=393 bgcolor=#fefefe
| 64393 ||  || — || October 23, 2001 || Socorro || LINEAR || V || align=right | 1.7 km || 
|-id=394 bgcolor=#fefefe
| 64394 ||  || — || October 23, 2001 || Socorro || LINEAR || NYS || align=right | 1.7 km || 
|-id=395 bgcolor=#fefefe
| 64395 ||  || — || October 23, 2001 || Socorro || LINEAR || NYS || align=right | 1.7 km || 
|-id=396 bgcolor=#E9E9E9
| 64396 ||  || — || October 23, 2001 || Socorro || LINEAR || — || align=right | 2.2 km || 
|-id=397 bgcolor=#E9E9E9
| 64397 ||  || — || October 23, 2001 || Socorro || LINEAR || — || align=right | 4.0 km || 
|-id=398 bgcolor=#d6d6d6
| 64398 ||  || — || October 23, 2001 || Socorro || LINEAR || — || align=right | 7.1 km || 
|-id=399 bgcolor=#fefefe
| 64399 ||  || — || October 23, 2001 || Socorro || LINEAR || V || align=right | 1.2 km || 
|-id=400 bgcolor=#fefefe
| 64400 ||  || — || October 23, 2001 || Socorro || LINEAR || MAS || align=right | 1.7 km || 
|}

64401–64500 

|-bgcolor=#fefefe
| 64401 ||  || — || October 23, 2001 || Socorro || LINEAR || — || align=right | 1.7 km || 
|-id=402 bgcolor=#fefefe
| 64402 ||  || — || October 23, 2001 || Socorro || LINEAR || V || align=right | 1.9 km || 
|-id=403 bgcolor=#fefefe
| 64403 ||  || — || October 23, 2001 || Socorro || LINEAR || — || align=right | 3.7 km || 
|-id=404 bgcolor=#fefefe
| 64404 ||  || — || October 23, 2001 || Socorro || LINEAR || — || align=right | 1.8 km || 
|-id=405 bgcolor=#fefefe
| 64405 ||  || — || October 23, 2001 || Socorro || LINEAR || NYS || align=right | 1.4 km || 
|-id=406 bgcolor=#fefefe
| 64406 ||  || — || October 23, 2001 || Socorro || LINEAR || — || align=right | 2.2 km || 
|-id=407 bgcolor=#E9E9E9
| 64407 ||  || — || October 18, 2001 || Palomar || NEAT || — || align=right | 4.6 km || 
|-id=408 bgcolor=#E9E9E9
| 64408 ||  || — || October 19, 2001 || Haleakala || NEAT || WIT || align=right | 2.3 km || 
|-id=409 bgcolor=#d6d6d6
| 64409 ||  || — || October 23, 2001 || Palomar || NEAT || — || align=right | 10 km || 
|-id=410 bgcolor=#E9E9E9
| 64410 ||  || — || October 19, 2001 || Socorro || LINEAR || — || align=right | 2.8 km || 
|-id=411 bgcolor=#E9E9E9
| 64411 ||  || — || October 19, 2001 || Socorro || LINEAR || — || align=right | 3.5 km || 
|-id=412 bgcolor=#E9E9E9
| 64412 ||  || — || October 19, 2001 || Socorro || LINEAR || EUN || align=right | 3.9 km || 
|-id=413 bgcolor=#E9E9E9
| 64413 ||  || — || October 19, 2001 || Socorro || LINEAR || — || align=right | 3.7 km || 
|-id=414 bgcolor=#E9E9E9
| 64414 ||  || — || October 21, 2001 || Socorro || LINEAR || — || align=right | 4.1 km || 
|-id=415 bgcolor=#fefefe
| 64415 ||  || — || October 18, 2001 || Palomar || NEAT || — || align=right | 1.6 km || 
|-id=416 bgcolor=#fefefe
| 64416 ||  || — || October 21, 2001 || Socorro || LINEAR || — || align=right | 2.2 km || 
|-id=417 bgcolor=#E9E9E9
| 64417 ||  || — || October 23, 2001 || Socorro || LINEAR || — || align=right | 3.2 km || 
|-id=418 bgcolor=#E9E9E9
| 64418 ||  || — || October 16, 2001 || Socorro || LINEAR || — || align=right | 2.7 km || 
|-id=419 bgcolor=#fefefe
| 64419 ||  || — || October 17, 2001 || Socorro || LINEAR || V || align=right | 1.2 km || 
|-id=420 bgcolor=#fefefe
| 64420 ||  || — || October 19, 2001 || Anderson Mesa || LONEOS || — || align=right | 2.1 km || 
|-id=421 bgcolor=#d6d6d6
| 64421 ||  || — || October 19, 2001 || Palomar || NEAT || HYG || align=right | 5.9 km || 
|-id=422 bgcolor=#d6d6d6
| 64422 ||  || — || October 20, 2001 || Socorro || LINEAR || EOS || align=right | 4.5 km || 
|-id=423 bgcolor=#E9E9E9
| 64423 ||  || — || October 24, 2001 || Socorro || LINEAR || — || align=right | 2.9 km || 
|-id=424 bgcolor=#E9E9E9
| 64424 ||  || — || November 9, 2001 || Palomar || NEAT || HOF || align=right | 6.4 km || 
|-id=425 bgcolor=#fefefe
| 64425 ||  || — || November 9, 2001 || Socorro || LINEAR || — || align=right | 2.2 km || 
|-id=426 bgcolor=#d6d6d6
| 64426 ||  || — || November 9, 2001 || Socorro || LINEAR || THM || align=right | 4.1 km || 
|-id=427 bgcolor=#fefefe
| 64427 ||  || — || November 9, 2001 || Socorro || LINEAR || FLO || align=right | 3.0 km || 
|-id=428 bgcolor=#fefefe
| 64428 ||  || — || November 9, 2001 || Socorro || LINEAR || — || align=right | 2.3 km || 
|-id=429 bgcolor=#d6d6d6
| 64429 ||  || — || November 9, 2001 || Socorro || LINEAR || — || align=right | 7.1 km || 
|-id=430 bgcolor=#E9E9E9
| 64430 ||  || — || November 9, 2001 || Socorro || LINEAR || — || align=right | 3.4 km || 
|-id=431 bgcolor=#E9E9E9
| 64431 ||  || — || November 10, 2001 || Socorro || LINEAR || — || align=right | 6.0 km || 
|-id=432 bgcolor=#d6d6d6
| 64432 ||  || — || November 10, 2001 || Socorro || LINEAR || — || align=right | 5.7 km || 
|-id=433 bgcolor=#fefefe
| 64433 ||  || — || November 10, 2001 || Socorro || LINEAR || FLO || align=right | 3.1 km || 
|-id=434 bgcolor=#E9E9E9
| 64434 ||  || — || November 7, 2001 || Palomar || NEAT || — || align=right | 5.5 km || 
|-id=435 bgcolor=#d6d6d6
| 64435 ||  || — || November 9, 2001 || Socorro || LINEAR || — || align=right | 4.8 km || 
|-id=436 bgcolor=#fefefe
| 64436 ||  || — || November 9, 2001 || Socorro || LINEAR || — || align=right | 1.5 km || 
|-id=437 bgcolor=#fefefe
| 64437 ||  || — || November 9, 2001 || Socorro || LINEAR || NYS || align=right | 1.8 km || 
|-id=438 bgcolor=#d6d6d6
| 64438 ||  || — || November 9, 2001 || Socorro || LINEAR || MEL || align=right | 6.8 km || 
|-id=439 bgcolor=#E9E9E9
| 64439 ||  || — || November 9, 2001 || Socorro || LINEAR || HEN || align=right | 2.1 km || 
|-id=440 bgcolor=#fefefe
| 64440 ||  || — || November 9, 2001 || Socorro || LINEAR || MAS || align=right | 1.9 km || 
|-id=441 bgcolor=#E9E9E9
| 64441 ||  || — || November 9, 2001 || Socorro || LINEAR || — || align=right | 3.3 km || 
|-id=442 bgcolor=#fefefe
| 64442 ||  || — || November 9, 2001 || Socorro || LINEAR || V || align=right | 1.8 km || 
|-id=443 bgcolor=#E9E9E9
| 64443 ||  || — || November 9, 2001 || Socorro || LINEAR || — || align=right | 3.2 km || 
|-id=444 bgcolor=#E9E9E9
| 64444 ||  || — || November 9, 2001 || Socorro || LINEAR || — || align=right | 3.5 km || 
|-id=445 bgcolor=#E9E9E9
| 64445 ||  || — || November 9, 2001 || Socorro || LINEAR || — || align=right | 2.3 km || 
|-id=446 bgcolor=#E9E9E9
| 64446 ||  || — || November 9, 2001 || Socorro || LINEAR || — || align=right | 4.7 km || 
|-id=447 bgcolor=#fefefe
| 64447 ||  || — || November 9, 2001 || Socorro || LINEAR || — || align=right | 1.9 km || 
|-id=448 bgcolor=#fefefe
| 64448 ||  || — || November 9, 2001 || Socorro || LINEAR || NYS || align=right | 4.8 km || 
|-id=449 bgcolor=#d6d6d6
| 64449 ||  || — || November 9, 2001 || Socorro || LINEAR || KOR || align=right | 3.2 km || 
|-id=450 bgcolor=#E9E9E9
| 64450 ||  || — || November 9, 2001 || Socorro || LINEAR || — || align=right | 2.7 km || 
|-id=451 bgcolor=#E9E9E9
| 64451 ||  || — || November 9, 2001 || Socorro || LINEAR || — || align=right | 4.2 km || 
|-id=452 bgcolor=#d6d6d6
| 64452 ||  || — || November 9, 2001 || Socorro || LINEAR || — || align=right | 7.6 km || 
|-id=453 bgcolor=#E9E9E9
| 64453 ||  || — || November 9, 2001 || Socorro || LINEAR || — || align=right | 4.1 km || 
|-id=454 bgcolor=#E9E9E9
| 64454 ||  || — || November 9, 2001 || Socorro || LINEAR || — || align=right | 4.1 km || 
|-id=455 bgcolor=#fefefe
| 64455 ||  || — || November 9, 2001 || Socorro || LINEAR || — || align=right | 2.2 km || 
|-id=456 bgcolor=#fefefe
| 64456 ||  || — || November 9, 2001 || Socorro || LINEAR || NYS || align=right | 1.7 km || 
|-id=457 bgcolor=#E9E9E9
| 64457 ||  || — || November 9, 2001 || Socorro || LINEAR || — || align=right | 3.6 km || 
|-id=458 bgcolor=#fefefe
| 64458 ||  || — || November 9, 2001 || Socorro || LINEAR || — || align=right | 2.2 km || 
|-id=459 bgcolor=#fefefe
| 64459 ||  || — || November 9, 2001 || Socorro || LINEAR || V || align=right | 1.8 km || 
|-id=460 bgcolor=#fefefe
| 64460 ||  || — || November 9, 2001 || Socorro || LINEAR || — || align=right | 2.3 km || 
|-id=461 bgcolor=#fefefe
| 64461 ||  || — || November 9, 2001 || Socorro || LINEAR || MAS || align=right | 1.8 km || 
|-id=462 bgcolor=#fefefe
| 64462 ||  || — || November 9, 2001 || Socorro || LINEAR || — || align=right | 2.3 km || 
|-id=463 bgcolor=#E9E9E9
| 64463 ||  || — || November 9, 2001 || Socorro || LINEAR || — || align=right | 3.4 km || 
|-id=464 bgcolor=#fefefe
| 64464 ||  || — || November 9, 2001 || Socorro || LINEAR || — || align=right | 1.8 km || 
|-id=465 bgcolor=#fefefe
| 64465 ||  || — || November 9, 2001 || Socorro || LINEAR || FLO || align=right | 1.9 km || 
|-id=466 bgcolor=#fefefe
| 64466 ||  || — || November 9, 2001 || Socorro || LINEAR || — || align=right | 2.0 km || 
|-id=467 bgcolor=#d6d6d6
| 64467 ||  || — || November 9, 2001 || Socorro || LINEAR || — || align=right | 4.9 km || 
|-id=468 bgcolor=#d6d6d6
| 64468 ||  || — || November 9, 2001 || Socorro || LINEAR || — || align=right | 5.7 km || 
|-id=469 bgcolor=#E9E9E9
| 64469 ||  || — || November 9, 2001 || Socorro || LINEAR || — || align=right | 2.9 km || 
|-id=470 bgcolor=#fefefe
| 64470 ||  || — || November 9, 2001 || Socorro || LINEAR || FLO || align=right | 1.7 km || 
|-id=471 bgcolor=#E9E9E9
| 64471 ||  || — || November 9, 2001 || Socorro || LINEAR || — || align=right | 3.1 km || 
|-id=472 bgcolor=#fefefe
| 64472 ||  || — || November 9, 2001 || Socorro || LINEAR || FLO || align=right | 4.8 km || 
|-id=473 bgcolor=#E9E9E9
| 64473 ||  || — || November 9, 2001 || Socorro || LINEAR || — || align=right | 3.6 km || 
|-id=474 bgcolor=#fefefe
| 64474 ||  || — || November 9, 2001 || Socorro || LINEAR || — || align=right | 3.0 km || 
|-id=475 bgcolor=#fefefe
| 64475 ||  || — || November 9, 2001 || Socorro || LINEAR || MAS || align=right | 1.6 km || 
|-id=476 bgcolor=#fefefe
| 64476 ||  || — || November 9, 2001 || Socorro || LINEAR || NYS || align=right | 5.0 km || 
|-id=477 bgcolor=#E9E9E9
| 64477 ||  || — || November 9, 2001 || Socorro || LINEAR || RAF || align=right | 5.8 km || 
|-id=478 bgcolor=#fefefe
| 64478 ||  || — || November 9, 2001 || Socorro || LINEAR || V || align=right | 3.0 km || 
|-id=479 bgcolor=#E9E9E9
| 64479 ||  || — || November 9, 2001 || Socorro || LINEAR || MAR || align=right | 3.0 km || 
|-id=480 bgcolor=#fefefe
| 64480 ||  || — || November 9, 2001 || Socorro || LINEAR || MAS || align=right | 2.3 km || 
|-id=481 bgcolor=#fefefe
| 64481 ||  || — || November 9, 2001 || Socorro || LINEAR || — || align=right | 2.9 km || 
|-id=482 bgcolor=#E9E9E9
| 64482 ||  || — || November 9, 2001 || Socorro || LINEAR || — || align=right | 3.4 km || 
|-id=483 bgcolor=#E9E9E9
| 64483 ||  || — || November 9, 2001 || Socorro || LINEAR || RAF || align=right | 3.8 km || 
|-id=484 bgcolor=#E9E9E9
| 64484 ||  || — || November 9, 2001 || Socorro || LINEAR || — || align=right | 2.3 km || 
|-id=485 bgcolor=#d6d6d6
| 64485 ||  || — || November 9, 2001 || Socorro || LINEAR || KOR || align=right | 3.4 km || 
|-id=486 bgcolor=#fefefe
| 64486 ||  || — || November 10, 2001 || Socorro || LINEAR || V || align=right | 1.9 km || 
|-id=487 bgcolor=#d6d6d6
| 64487 ||  || — || November 10, 2001 || Socorro || LINEAR || EOS || align=right | 4.7 km || 
|-id=488 bgcolor=#fefefe
| 64488 ||  || — || November 10, 2001 || Socorro || LINEAR || — || align=right | 1.9 km || 
|-id=489 bgcolor=#d6d6d6
| 64489 ||  || — || November 10, 2001 || Socorro || LINEAR || — || align=right | 7.4 km || 
|-id=490 bgcolor=#E9E9E9
| 64490 ||  || — || November 10, 2001 || Socorro || LINEAR || — || align=right | 6.5 km || 
|-id=491 bgcolor=#fefefe
| 64491 ||  || — || November 10, 2001 || Socorro || LINEAR || — || align=right | 1.9 km || 
|-id=492 bgcolor=#fefefe
| 64492 ||  || — || November 10, 2001 || Socorro || LINEAR || FLO || align=right | 1.8 km || 
|-id=493 bgcolor=#E9E9E9
| 64493 ||  || — || November 10, 2001 || Socorro || LINEAR || — || align=right | 4.7 km || 
|-id=494 bgcolor=#fefefe
| 64494 ||  || — || November 10, 2001 || Socorro || LINEAR || — || align=right | 1.4 km || 
|-id=495 bgcolor=#d6d6d6
| 64495 ||  || — || November 10, 2001 || Socorro || LINEAR || EUP || align=right | 7.2 km || 
|-id=496 bgcolor=#d6d6d6
| 64496 ||  || — || November 10, 2001 || Socorro || LINEAR || — || align=right | 4.8 km || 
|-id=497 bgcolor=#E9E9E9
| 64497 ||  || — || November 10, 2001 || Socorro || LINEAR || — || align=right | 2.6 km || 
|-id=498 bgcolor=#fefefe
| 64498 ||  || — || November 10, 2001 || Socorro || LINEAR || FLO || align=right | 3.0 km || 
|-id=499 bgcolor=#E9E9E9
| 64499 ||  || — || November 10, 2001 || Socorro || LINEAR || DOR || align=right | 4.7 km || 
|-id=500 bgcolor=#E9E9E9
| 64500 ||  || — || November 10, 2001 || Socorro || LINEAR || — || align=right | 4.0 km || 
|}

64501–64600 

|-bgcolor=#E9E9E9
| 64501 ||  || — || November 10, 2001 || Socorro || LINEAR || — || align=right | 6.1 km || 
|-id=502 bgcolor=#E9E9E9
| 64502 ||  || — || November 10, 2001 || Socorro || LINEAR || AGN || align=right | 2.7 km || 
|-id=503 bgcolor=#E9E9E9
| 64503 ||  || — || November 11, 2001 || Socorro || LINEAR || — || align=right | 4.3 km || 
|-id=504 bgcolor=#E9E9E9
| 64504 ||  || — || November 11, 2001 || Socorro || LINEAR || — || align=right | 3.0 km || 
|-id=505 bgcolor=#fefefe
| 64505 ||  || — || November 15, 2001 || Kitt Peak || Spacewatch || MAS || align=right | 1.0 km || 
|-id=506 bgcolor=#E9E9E9
| 64506 ||  || — || November 12, 2001 || Goodricke-Pigott || R. A. Tucker || — || align=right | 5.0 km || 
|-id=507 bgcolor=#E9E9E9
| 64507 ||  || — || November 9, 2001 || Palomar || NEAT || DOR || align=right | 5.8 km || 
|-id=508 bgcolor=#E9E9E9
| 64508 ||  || — || November 9, 2001 || Palomar || NEAT || MRX || align=right | 2.5 km || 
|-id=509 bgcolor=#fefefe
| 64509 ||  || — || November 13, 2001 || Haleakala || NEAT || — || align=right | 3.1 km || 
|-id=510 bgcolor=#E9E9E9
| 64510 ||  || — || November 15, 2001 || Haleakala || NEAT || — || align=right | 4.3 km || 
|-id=511 bgcolor=#fefefe
| 64511 ||  || — || November 10, 2001 || Socorro || LINEAR || — || align=right | 1.6 km || 
|-id=512 bgcolor=#fefefe
| 64512 ||  || — || November 12, 2001 || Socorro || LINEAR || NYS || align=right | 1.6 km || 
|-id=513 bgcolor=#fefefe
| 64513 ||  || — || November 12, 2001 || Socorro || LINEAR || V || align=right | 1.3 km || 
|-id=514 bgcolor=#E9E9E9
| 64514 ||  || — || November 12, 2001 || Anderson Mesa || LONEOS || EUN || align=right | 2.5 km || 
|-id=515 bgcolor=#E9E9E9
| 64515 ||  || — || November 15, 2001 || Socorro || LINEAR || — || align=right | 2.8 km || 
|-id=516 bgcolor=#E9E9E9
| 64516 ||  || — || November 15, 2001 || Socorro || LINEAR || — || align=right | 3.5 km || 
|-id=517 bgcolor=#E9E9E9
| 64517 ||  || — || November 15, 2001 || Socorro || LINEAR || EUN || align=right | 3.3 km || 
|-id=518 bgcolor=#E9E9E9
| 64518 ||  || — || November 15, 2001 || Socorro || LINEAR || — || align=right | 11 km || 
|-id=519 bgcolor=#fefefe
| 64519 ||  || — || November 15, 2001 || Socorro || LINEAR || — || align=right | 1.9 km || 
|-id=520 bgcolor=#E9E9E9
| 64520 ||  || — || November 15, 2001 || Socorro || LINEAR || MAR || align=right | 3.7 km || 
|-id=521 bgcolor=#fefefe
| 64521 ||  || — || November 15, 2001 || Socorro || LINEAR || — || align=right | 2.9 km || 
|-id=522 bgcolor=#E9E9E9
| 64522 ||  || — || November 15, 2001 || Socorro || LINEAR || EUN || align=right | 4.2 km || 
|-id=523 bgcolor=#E9E9E9
| 64523 ||  || — || November 15, 2001 || Socorro || LINEAR || — || align=right | 6.8 km || 
|-id=524 bgcolor=#fefefe
| 64524 ||  || — || November 15, 2001 || Socorro || LINEAR || PHO || align=right | 3.2 km || 
|-id=525 bgcolor=#E9E9E9
| 64525 ||  || — || November 12, 2001 || Socorro || LINEAR || — || align=right | 3.8 km || 
|-id=526 bgcolor=#fefefe
| 64526 ||  || — || November 12, 2001 || Socorro || LINEAR || — || align=right | 1.8 km || 
|-id=527 bgcolor=#E9E9E9
| 64527 ||  || — || November 12, 2001 || Socorro || LINEAR || — || align=right | 5.1 km || 
|-id=528 bgcolor=#fefefe
| 64528 ||  || — || November 12, 2001 || Socorro || LINEAR || — || align=right | 2.0 km || 
|-id=529 bgcolor=#fefefe
| 64529 ||  || — || November 12, 2001 || Socorro || LINEAR || FLO || align=right | 1.6 km || 
|-id=530 bgcolor=#fefefe
| 64530 ||  || — || November 12, 2001 || Socorro || LINEAR || MAS || align=right | 1.8 km || 
|-id=531 bgcolor=#fefefe
| 64531 ||  || — || November 12, 2001 || Socorro || LINEAR || FLO || align=right | 1.9 km || 
|-id=532 bgcolor=#d6d6d6
| 64532 ||  || — || November 12, 2001 || Socorro || LINEAR || HYG || align=right | 5.6 km || 
|-id=533 bgcolor=#d6d6d6
| 64533 ||  || — || November 12, 2001 || Socorro || LINEAR || THM || align=right | 4.3 km || 
|-id=534 bgcolor=#fefefe
| 64534 ||  || — || November 12, 2001 || Socorro || LINEAR || FLO || align=right | 1.6 km || 
|-id=535 bgcolor=#d6d6d6
| 64535 ||  || — || November 12, 2001 || Socorro || LINEAR || HYG || align=right | 6.0 km || 
|-id=536 bgcolor=#E9E9E9
| 64536 ||  || — || November 12, 2001 || Socorro || LINEAR || — || align=right | 2.2 km || 
|-id=537 bgcolor=#fefefe
| 64537 ||  || — || November 12, 2001 || Socorro || LINEAR || FLO || align=right | 1.9 km || 
|-id=538 bgcolor=#fefefe
| 64538 ||  || — || November 12, 2001 || Socorro || LINEAR || — || align=right | 1.7 km || 
|-id=539 bgcolor=#d6d6d6
| 64539 ||  || — || November 12, 2001 || Socorro || LINEAR || — || align=right | 5.9 km || 
|-id=540 bgcolor=#d6d6d6
| 64540 ||  || — || November 12, 2001 || Socorro || LINEAR || HYG || align=right | 5.8 km || 
|-id=541 bgcolor=#E9E9E9
| 64541 ||  || — || November 12, 2001 || Socorro || LINEAR || — || align=right | 4.1 km || 
|-id=542 bgcolor=#d6d6d6
| 64542 ||  || — || November 12, 2001 || Socorro || LINEAR || — || align=right | 5.0 km || 
|-id=543 bgcolor=#fefefe
| 64543 ||  || — || November 12, 2001 || Socorro || LINEAR || FLO || align=right | 4.6 km || 
|-id=544 bgcolor=#d6d6d6
| 64544 ||  || — || November 15, 2001 || Socorro || LINEAR || — || align=right | 7.2 km || 
|-id=545 bgcolor=#d6d6d6
| 64545 ||  || — || November 13, 2001 || Haleakala || NEAT || — || align=right | 6.4 km || 
|-id=546 bgcolor=#fefefe
| 64546 ||  || — || November 13, 2001 || Haleakala || NEAT || — || align=right | 2.8 km || 
|-id=547 bgcolor=#fefefe
| 64547 Saku || 2001 WF ||  || November 16, 2001 || Bisei SG Center || BATTeRS || — || align=right | 2.6 km || 
|-id=548 bgcolor=#fefefe
| 64548 ||  || — || November 17, 2001 || Kitt Peak || Spacewatch || — || align=right | 1.5 km || 
|-id=549 bgcolor=#fefefe
| 64549 ||  || — || November 18, 2001 || Bisei SG Center || BATTeRS || — || align=right | 1.5 km || 
|-id=550 bgcolor=#fefefe
| 64550 ||  || — || November 17, 2001 || Socorro || LINEAR || NYS || align=right | 1.7 km || 
|-id=551 bgcolor=#fefefe
| 64551 ||  || — || November 17, 2001 || Socorro || LINEAR || FLO || align=right | 1.7 km || 
|-id=552 bgcolor=#E9E9E9
| 64552 ||  || — || November 17, 2001 || Anderson Mesa || LONEOS || — || align=right | 6.3 km || 
|-id=553 bgcolor=#fefefe
| 64553 Segorbe ||  ||  || November 24, 2001 || Pla D'Arguines || R. Ferrando || — || align=right | 2.1 km || 
|-id=554 bgcolor=#fefefe
| 64554 ||  || — || November 17, 2001 || Socorro || LINEAR || — || align=right | 2.8 km || 
|-id=555 bgcolor=#E9E9E9
| 64555 ||  || — || November 18, 2001 || Socorro || LINEAR || EUN || align=right | 2.5 km || 
|-id=556 bgcolor=#E9E9E9
| 64556 ||  || — || November 18, 2001 || Socorro || LINEAR || — || align=right | 3.7 km || 
|-id=557 bgcolor=#fefefe
| 64557 ||  || — || November 17, 2001 || Socorro || LINEAR || — || align=right | 1.2 km || 
|-id=558 bgcolor=#fefefe
| 64558 ||  || — || November 17, 2001 || Socorro || LINEAR || V || align=right | 1.6 km || 
|-id=559 bgcolor=#fefefe
| 64559 ||  || — || November 17, 2001 || Socorro || LINEAR || — || align=right | 3.5 km || 
|-id=560 bgcolor=#fefefe
| 64560 ||  || — || November 17, 2001 || Socorro || LINEAR || FLO || align=right | 4.0 km || 
|-id=561 bgcolor=#E9E9E9
| 64561 ||  || — || November 17, 2001 || Socorro || LINEAR || RAF || align=right | 1.5 km || 
|-id=562 bgcolor=#d6d6d6
| 64562 ||  || — || November 17, 2001 || Socorro || LINEAR || EOS || align=right | 4.4 km || 
|-id=563 bgcolor=#E9E9E9
| 64563 ||  || — || November 17, 2001 || Socorro || LINEAR || PAD || align=right | 3.7 km || 
|-id=564 bgcolor=#d6d6d6
| 64564 ||  || — || November 17, 2001 || Socorro || LINEAR || HYG || align=right | 5.8 km || 
|-id=565 bgcolor=#fefefe
| 64565 ||  || — || November 17, 2001 || Socorro || LINEAR || — || align=right | 2.1 km || 
|-id=566 bgcolor=#fefefe
| 64566 ||  || — || November 17, 2001 || Socorro || LINEAR || V || align=right | 2.3 km || 
|-id=567 bgcolor=#fefefe
| 64567 ||  || — || November 17, 2001 || Socorro || LINEAR || — || align=right | 2.5 km || 
|-id=568 bgcolor=#E9E9E9
| 64568 ||  || — || November 17, 2001 || Socorro || LINEAR || DOR || align=right | 4.0 km || 
|-id=569 bgcolor=#fefefe
| 64569 ||  || — || November 17, 2001 || Socorro || LINEAR || — || align=right | 1.9 km || 
|-id=570 bgcolor=#fefefe
| 64570 ||  || — || November 17, 2001 || Socorro || LINEAR || — || align=right | 1.6 km || 
|-id=571 bgcolor=#fefefe
| 64571 ||  || — || November 17, 2001 || Socorro || LINEAR || — || align=right | 2.9 km || 
|-id=572 bgcolor=#E9E9E9
| 64572 ||  || — || November 17, 2001 || Socorro || LINEAR || — || align=right | 3.3 km || 
|-id=573 bgcolor=#fefefe
| 64573 ||  || — || November 17, 2001 || Socorro || LINEAR || — || align=right | 1.8 km || 
|-id=574 bgcolor=#fefefe
| 64574 ||  || — || November 17, 2001 || Socorro || LINEAR || — || align=right | 2.5 km || 
|-id=575 bgcolor=#E9E9E9
| 64575 ||  || — || November 17, 2001 || Socorro || LINEAR || — || align=right | 2.9 km || 
|-id=576 bgcolor=#fefefe
| 64576 ||  || — || November 17, 2001 || Socorro || LINEAR || — || align=right | 1.9 km || 
|-id=577 bgcolor=#fefefe
| 64577 ||  || — || November 17, 2001 || Socorro || LINEAR || H || align=right | 3.3 km || 
|-id=578 bgcolor=#fefefe
| 64578 ||  || — || November 18, 2001 || Socorro || LINEAR || SUL || align=right | 4.2 km || 
|-id=579 bgcolor=#E9E9E9
| 64579 ||  || — || November 16, 2001 || Palomar || NEAT || — || align=right | 5.9 km || 
|-id=580 bgcolor=#d6d6d6
| 64580 ||  || — || November 17, 2001 || Socorro || LINEAR || THM || align=right | 4.7 km || 
|-id=581 bgcolor=#E9E9E9
| 64581 ||  || — || November 19, 2001 || Socorro || LINEAR || — || align=right | 2.9 km || 
|-id=582 bgcolor=#fefefe
| 64582 ||  || — || November 20, 2001 || Socorro || LINEAR || — || align=right | 1.8 km || 
|-id=583 bgcolor=#E9E9E9
| 64583 ||  || — || November 20, 2001 || Socorro || LINEAR || — || align=right | 2.2 km || 
|-id=584 bgcolor=#fefefe
| 64584 ||  || — || November 19, 2001 || Socorro || LINEAR || V || align=right | 1.9 km || 
|-id=585 bgcolor=#fefefe
| 64585 ||  || — || November 21, 2001 || Socorro || LINEAR || — || align=right | 1.5 km || 
|-id=586 bgcolor=#E9E9E9
| 64586 ||  || — || November 20, 2001 || Socorro || LINEAR || — || align=right | 2.4 km || 
|-id=587 bgcolor=#E9E9E9
| 64587 || 2001 XA || — || December 1, 2001 || Ametlla de Mar || J. Nomen || — || align=right | 5.6 km || 
|-id=588 bgcolor=#fefefe
| 64588 ||  || — || December 9, 2001 || Socorro || LINEAR || PHO || align=right | 5.5 km || 
|-id=589 bgcolor=#d6d6d6
| 64589 ||  || — || December 7, 2001 || Socorro || LINEAR || — || align=right | 6.0 km || 
|-id=590 bgcolor=#d6d6d6
| 64590 ||  || — || December 8, 2001 || Socorro || LINEAR || FIR || align=right | 6.6 km || 
|-id=591 bgcolor=#E9E9E9
| 64591 ||  || — || December 8, 2001 || Socorro || LINEAR || — || align=right | 4.1 km || 
|-id=592 bgcolor=#E9E9E9
| 64592 ||  || — || December 8, 2001 || Socorro || LINEAR || EUN || align=right | 4.2 km || 
|-id=593 bgcolor=#E9E9E9
| 64593 ||  || — || December 9, 2001 || Socorro || LINEAR || — || align=right | 5.4 km || 
|-id=594 bgcolor=#fefefe
| 64594 ||  || — || December 9, 2001 || Socorro || LINEAR || — || align=right | 1.9 km || 
|-id=595 bgcolor=#d6d6d6
| 64595 ||  || — || December 9, 2001 || Socorro || LINEAR || EOS || align=right | 4.2 km || 
|-id=596 bgcolor=#fefefe
| 64596 ||  || — || December 10, 2001 || Socorro || LINEAR || — || align=right | 1.7 km || 
|-id=597 bgcolor=#E9E9E9
| 64597 ||  || — || December 9, 2001 || Socorro || LINEAR || — || align=right | 2.7 km || 
|-id=598 bgcolor=#E9E9E9
| 64598 ||  || — || December 9, 2001 || Socorro || LINEAR || EUN || align=right | 4.0 km || 
|-id=599 bgcolor=#fefefe
| 64599 ||  || — || December 9, 2001 || Socorro || LINEAR || V || align=right | 2.3 km || 
|-id=600 bgcolor=#fefefe
| 64600 ||  || — || December 9, 2001 || Socorro || LINEAR || V || align=right | 2.2 km || 
|}

64601–64700 

|-bgcolor=#E9E9E9
| 64601 ||  || — || December 9, 2001 || Socorro || LINEAR || — || align=right | 5.8 km || 
|-id=602 bgcolor=#fefefe
| 64602 ||  || — || December 9, 2001 || Socorro || LINEAR || — || align=right | 2.8 km || 
|-id=603 bgcolor=#fefefe
| 64603 ||  || — || December 9, 2001 || Socorro || LINEAR || — || align=right | 2.0 km || 
|-id=604 bgcolor=#E9E9E9
| 64604 ||  || — || December 9, 2001 || Socorro || LINEAR || GEF || align=right | 2.9 km || 
|-id=605 bgcolor=#E9E9E9
| 64605 ||  || — || December 9, 2001 || Socorro || LINEAR || — || align=right | 4.1 km || 
|-id=606 bgcolor=#fefefe
| 64606 ||  || — || December 9, 2001 || Socorro || LINEAR || — || align=right | 2.4 km || 
|-id=607 bgcolor=#d6d6d6
| 64607 ||  || — || December 9, 2001 || Socorro || LINEAR || — || align=right | 5.6 km || 
|-id=608 bgcolor=#fefefe
| 64608 ||  || — || December 9, 2001 || Socorro || LINEAR || — || align=right | 3.0 km || 
|-id=609 bgcolor=#E9E9E9
| 64609 ||  || — || December 10, 2001 || Socorro || LINEAR || — || align=right | 3.0 km || 
|-id=610 bgcolor=#fefefe
| 64610 ||  || — || December 10, 2001 || Socorro || LINEAR || — || align=right | 2.6 km || 
|-id=611 bgcolor=#E9E9E9
| 64611 ||  || — || December 10, 2001 || Socorro || LINEAR || — || align=right | 5.2 km || 
|-id=612 bgcolor=#fefefe
| 64612 ||  || — || December 10, 2001 || Socorro || LINEAR || FLO || align=right | 5.6 km || 
|-id=613 bgcolor=#E9E9E9
| 64613 ||  || — || December 10, 2001 || Socorro || LINEAR || — || align=right | 3.2 km || 
|-id=614 bgcolor=#fefefe
| 64614 ||  || — || December 10, 2001 || Socorro || LINEAR || FLO || align=right | 2.0 km || 
|-id=615 bgcolor=#fefefe
| 64615 ||  || — || December 10, 2001 || Socorro || LINEAR || — || align=right | 3.2 km || 
|-id=616 bgcolor=#fefefe
| 64616 ||  || — || December 11, 2001 || Socorro || LINEAR || V || align=right | 1.8 km || 
|-id=617 bgcolor=#fefefe
| 64617 ||  || — || December 11, 2001 || Socorro || LINEAR || — || align=right | 2.3 km || 
|-id=618 bgcolor=#fefefe
| 64618 ||  || — || December 11, 2001 || Socorro || LINEAR || FLO || align=right | 2.6 km || 
|-id=619 bgcolor=#E9E9E9
| 64619 ||  || — || December 11, 2001 || Socorro || LINEAR || — || align=right | 2.5 km || 
|-id=620 bgcolor=#E9E9E9
| 64620 ||  || — || December 11, 2001 || Socorro || LINEAR || — || align=right | 3.4 km || 
|-id=621 bgcolor=#E9E9E9
| 64621 ||  || — || December 11, 2001 || Socorro || LINEAR || EUN || align=right | 4.2 km || 
|-id=622 bgcolor=#E9E9E9
| 64622 ||  || — || December 14, 2001 || Oaxaca || J. M. Roe || MIS || align=right | 6.7 km || 
|-id=623 bgcolor=#E9E9E9
| 64623 ||  || — || December 9, 2001 || Socorro || LINEAR || EUN || align=right | 3.0 km || 
|-id=624 bgcolor=#E9E9E9
| 64624 ||  || — || December 9, 2001 || Socorro || LINEAR || ADE || align=right | 6.0 km || 
|-id=625 bgcolor=#E9E9E9
| 64625 ||  || — || December 9, 2001 || Socorro || LINEAR || — || align=right | 3.6 km || 
|-id=626 bgcolor=#fefefe
| 64626 ||  || — || December 9, 2001 || Socorro || LINEAR || V || align=right | 1.8 km || 
|-id=627 bgcolor=#d6d6d6
| 64627 ||  || — || December 9, 2001 || Socorro || LINEAR || — || align=right | 6.0 km || 
|-id=628 bgcolor=#d6d6d6
| 64628 ||  || — || December 9, 2001 || Socorro || LINEAR || — || align=right | 7.7 km || 
|-id=629 bgcolor=#E9E9E9
| 64629 ||  || — || December 9, 2001 || Socorro || LINEAR || — || align=right | 4.1 km || 
|-id=630 bgcolor=#E9E9E9
| 64630 ||  || — || December 9, 2001 || Socorro || LINEAR || — || align=right | 5.2 km || 
|-id=631 bgcolor=#d6d6d6
| 64631 ||  || — || December 9, 2001 || Socorro || LINEAR || EMA || align=right | 7.9 km || 
|-id=632 bgcolor=#d6d6d6
| 64632 ||  || — || December 9, 2001 || Socorro || LINEAR || — || align=right | 9.3 km || 
|-id=633 bgcolor=#E9E9E9
| 64633 ||  || — || December 9, 2001 || Socorro || LINEAR || ADE || align=right | 5.4 km || 
|-id=634 bgcolor=#fefefe
| 64634 ||  || — || December 10, 2001 || Socorro || LINEAR || — || align=right | 1.5 km || 
|-id=635 bgcolor=#d6d6d6
| 64635 ||  || — || December 10, 2001 || Socorro || LINEAR || KOR || align=right | 2.9 km || 
|-id=636 bgcolor=#fefefe
| 64636 ||  || — || December 11, 2001 || Socorro || LINEAR || — || align=right | 5.7 km || 
|-id=637 bgcolor=#d6d6d6
| 64637 ||  || — || December 10, 2001 || Socorro || LINEAR || — || align=right | 4.3 km || 
|-id=638 bgcolor=#fefefe
| 64638 ||  || — || December 11, 2001 || Socorro || LINEAR || V || align=right | 1.8 km || 
|-id=639 bgcolor=#E9E9E9
| 64639 ||  || — || December 10, 2001 || Socorro || LINEAR || HEN || align=right | 2.7 km || 
|-id=640 bgcolor=#fefefe
| 64640 ||  || — || December 10, 2001 || Socorro || LINEAR || — || align=right | 4.6 km || 
|-id=641 bgcolor=#fefefe
| 64641 ||  || — || December 10, 2001 || Socorro || LINEAR || NYS || align=right | 1.7 km || 
|-id=642 bgcolor=#d6d6d6
| 64642 ||  || — || December 10, 2001 || Socorro || LINEAR || THM || align=right | 6.3 km || 
|-id=643 bgcolor=#fefefe
| 64643 ||  || — || December 10, 2001 || Socorro || LINEAR || V || align=right | 2.2 km || 
|-id=644 bgcolor=#d6d6d6
| 64644 ||  || — || December 10, 2001 || Socorro || LINEAR || — || align=right | 6.0 km || 
|-id=645 bgcolor=#fefefe
| 64645 ||  || — || December 10, 2001 || Socorro || LINEAR || FLO || align=right | 1.5 km || 
|-id=646 bgcolor=#E9E9E9
| 64646 ||  || — || December 10, 2001 || Socorro || LINEAR || — || align=right | 5.4 km || 
|-id=647 bgcolor=#E9E9E9
| 64647 ||  || — || December 10, 2001 || Socorro || LINEAR || — || align=right | 5.1 km || 
|-id=648 bgcolor=#fefefe
| 64648 ||  || — || December 10, 2001 || Socorro || LINEAR || NYS || align=right | 4.0 km || 
|-id=649 bgcolor=#E9E9E9
| 64649 ||  || — || December 10, 2001 || Socorro || LINEAR || — || align=right | 5.6 km || 
|-id=650 bgcolor=#E9E9E9
| 64650 ||  || — || December 10, 2001 || Socorro || LINEAR || — || align=right | 2.2 km || 
|-id=651 bgcolor=#E9E9E9
| 64651 ||  || — || December 11, 2001 || Socorro || LINEAR || — || align=right | 6.9 km || 
|-id=652 bgcolor=#fefefe
| 64652 ||  || — || December 10, 2001 || Socorro || LINEAR || NYS || align=right | 2.0 km || 
|-id=653 bgcolor=#E9E9E9
| 64653 ||  || — || December 11, 2001 || Socorro || LINEAR || GEF || align=right | 3.6 km || 
|-id=654 bgcolor=#d6d6d6
| 64654 ||  || — || December 10, 2001 || Socorro || LINEAR || THM || align=right | 6.0 km || 
|-id=655 bgcolor=#fefefe
| 64655 ||  || — || December 10, 2001 || Socorro || LINEAR || — || align=right | 2.9 km || 
|-id=656 bgcolor=#fefefe
| 64656 ||  || — || December 10, 2001 || Socorro || LINEAR || — || align=right | 2.0 km || 
|-id=657 bgcolor=#E9E9E9
| 64657 ||  || — || December 10, 2001 || Socorro || LINEAR || — || align=right | 2.5 km || 
|-id=658 bgcolor=#fefefe
| 64658 ||  || — || December 10, 2001 || Socorro || LINEAR || — || align=right | 4.2 km || 
|-id=659 bgcolor=#fefefe
| 64659 ||  || — || December 10, 2001 || Socorro || LINEAR || NYS || align=right | 5.1 km || 
|-id=660 bgcolor=#E9E9E9
| 64660 ||  || — || December 10, 2001 || Socorro || LINEAR || — || align=right | 3.0 km || 
|-id=661 bgcolor=#E9E9E9
| 64661 ||  || — || December 10, 2001 || Socorro || LINEAR || — || align=right | 7.1 km || 
|-id=662 bgcolor=#fefefe
| 64662 ||  || — || December 10, 2001 || Socorro || LINEAR || MAS || align=right | 2.1 km || 
|-id=663 bgcolor=#fefefe
| 64663 ||  || — || December 10, 2001 || Socorro || LINEAR || MAS || align=right | 1.9 km || 
|-id=664 bgcolor=#d6d6d6
| 64664 ||  || — || December 10, 2001 || Socorro || LINEAR || — || align=right | 5.4 km || 
|-id=665 bgcolor=#fefefe
| 64665 ||  || — || December 10, 2001 || Socorro || LINEAR || FLO || align=right | 2.3 km || 
|-id=666 bgcolor=#E9E9E9
| 64666 ||  || — || December 10, 2001 || Socorro || LINEAR || — || align=right | 2.3 km || 
|-id=667 bgcolor=#d6d6d6
| 64667 ||  || — || December 10, 2001 || Socorro || LINEAR || — || align=right | 4.8 km || 
|-id=668 bgcolor=#fefefe
| 64668 ||  || — || December 10, 2001 || Socorro || LINEAR || — || align=right | 2.0 km || 
|-id=669 bgcolor=#fefefe
| 64669 ||  || — || December 10, 2001 || Socorro || LINEAR || NYS || align=right | 2.6 km || 
|-id=670 bgcolor=#fefefe
| 64670 ||  || — || December 10, 2001 || Socorro || LINEAR || — || align=right | 2.2 km || 
|-id=671 bgcolor=#E9E9E9
| 64671 ||  || — || December 10, 2001 || Socorro || LINEAR || HEN || align=right | 2.3 km || 
|-id=672 bgcolor=#fefefe
| 64672 ||  || — || December 10, 2001 || Socorro || LINEAR || — || align=right | 2.2 km || 
|-id=673 bgcolor=#E9E9E9
| 64673 ||  || — || December 10, 2001 || Socorro || LINEAR || — || align=right | 2.1 km || 
|-id=674 bgcolor=#fefefe
| 64674 ||  || — || December 10, 2001 || Socorro || LINEAR || — || align=right | 2.9 km || 
|-id=675 bgcolor=#fefefe
| 64675 ||  || — || December 10, 2001 || Socorro || LINEAR || NYS || align=right | 4.7 km || 
|-id=676 bgcolor=#fefefe
| 64676 ||  || — || December 10, 2001 || Socorro || LINEAR || — || align=right | 4.0 km || 
|-id=677 bgcolor=#E9E9E9
| 64677 ||  || — || December 10, 2001 || Socorro || LINEAR || BRU || align=right | 7.6 km || 
|-id=678 bgcolor=#E9E9E9
| 64678 ||  || — || December 11, 2001 || Socorro || LINEAR || EUN || align=right | 3.8 km || 
|-id=679 bgcolor=#fefefe
| 64679 ||  || — || December 11, 2001 || Socorro || LINEAR || — || align=right | 2.2 km || 
|-id=680 bgcolor=#E9E9E9
| 64680 ||  || — || December 11, 2001 || Socorro || LINEAR || EUN || align=right | 2.6 km || 
|-id=681 bgcolor=#d6d6d6
| 64681 ||  || — || December 11, 2001 || Socorro || LINEAR || KOR || align=right | 2.8 km || 
|-id=682 bgcolor=#E9E9E9
| 64682 ||  || — || December 11, 2001 || Socorro || LINEAR || — || align=right | 5.2 km || 
|-id=683 bgcolor=#d6d6d6
| 64683 ||  || — || December 11, 2001 || Socorro || LINEAR || — || align=right | 8.1 km || 
|-id=684 bgcolor=#E9E9E9
| 64684 ||  || — || December 11, 2001 || Socorro || LINEAR || — || align=right | 6.1 km || 
|-id=685 bgcolor=#fefefe
| 64685 ||  || — || December 11, 2001 || Socorro || LINEAR || V || align=right | 2.4 km || 
|-id=686 bgcolor=#fefefe
| 64686 ||  || — || December 11, 2001 || Socorro || LINEAR || V || align=right | 1.6 km || 
|-id=687 bgcolor=#fefefe
| 64687 ||  || — || December 11, 2001 || Socorro || LINEAR || — || align=right | 1.9 km || 
|-id=688 bgcolor=#d6d6d6
| 64688 ||  || — || December 11, 2001 || Socorro || LINEAR || — || align=right | 7.2 km || 
|-id=689 bgcolor=#E9E9E9
| 64689 ||  || — || December 11, 2001 || Socorro || LINEAR || — || align=right | 7.8 km || 
|-id=690 bgcolor=#fefefe
| 64690 ||  || — || December 11, 2001 || Socorro || LINEAR || — || align=right | 1.7 km || 
|-id=691 bgcolor=#E9E9E9
| 64691 ||  || — || December 11, 2001 || Socorro || LINEAR || — || align=right | 4.7 km || 
|-id=692 bgcolor=#d6d6d6
| 64692 ||  || — || December 11, 2001 || Socorro || LINEAR || EOS || align=right | 5.0 km || 
|-id=693 bgcolor=#E9E9E9
| 64693 ||  || — || December 11, 2001 || Socorro || LINEAR || — || align=right | 4.7 km || 
|-id=694 bgcolor=#d6d6d6
| 64694 ||  || — || December 11, 2001 || Socorro || LINEAR || — || align=right | 7.1 km || 
|-id=695 bgcolor=#E9E9E9
| 64695 ||  || — || December 11, 2001 || Socorro || LINEAR || — || align=right | 2.3 km || 
|-id=696 bgcolor=#fefefe
| 64696 ||  || — || December 11, 2001 || Socorro || LINEAR || NYS || align=right | 1.6 km || 
|-id=697 bgcolor=#fefefe
| 64697 ||  || — || December 11, 2001 || Socorro || LINEAR || V || align=right | 1.9 km || 
|-id=698 bgcolor=#fefefe
| 64698 ||  || — || December 11, 2001 || Socorro || LINEAR || — || align=right | 1.6 km || 
|-id=699 bgcolor=#fefefe
| 64699 ||  || — || December 11, 2001 || Socorro || LINEAR || NYS || align=right | 2.8 km || 
|-id=700 bgcolor=#d6d6d6
| 64700 ||  || — || December 11, 2001 || Socorro || LINEAR || HYG || align=right | 7.7 km || 
|}

64701–64800 

|-bgcolor=#fefefe
| 64701 ||  || — || December 11, 2001 || Socorro || LINEAR || FLO || align=right | 2.6 km || 
|-id=702 bgcolor=#E9E9E9
| 64702 ||  || — || December 13, 2001 || Socorro || LINEAR || MRX || align=right | 2.4 km || 
|-id=703 bgcolor=#d6d6d6
| 64703 ||  || — || December 13, 2001 || Socorro || LINEAR || — || align=right | 9.8 km || 
|-id=704 bgcolor=#E9E9E9
| 64704 ||  || — || December 14, 2001 || Desert Eagle || W. K. Y. Yeung || ADE || align=right | 7.7 km || 
|-id=705 bgcolor=#d6d6d6
| 64705 ||  || — || December 10, 2001 || Socorro || LINEAR || — || align=right | 3.7 km || 
|-id=706 bgcolor=#E9E9E9
| 64706 ||  || — || December 10, 2001 || Socorro || LINEAR || — || align=right | 2.2 km || 
|-id=707 bgcolor=#E9E9E9
| 64707 ||  || — || December 10, 2001 || Socorro || LINEAR || — || align=right | 2.8 km || 
|-id=708 bgcolor=#d6d6d6
| 64708 ||  || — || December 10, 2001 || Socorro || LINEAR || — || align=right | 4.2 km || 
|-id=709 bgcolor=#E9E9E9
| 64709 ||  || — || December 10, 2001 || Socorro || LINEAR || HEN || align=right | 2.6 km || 
|-id=710 bgcolor=#fefefe
| 64710 ||  || — || December 10, 2001 || Socorro || LINEAR || MAS || align=right | 1.7 km || 
|-id=711 bgcolor=#d6d6d6
| 64711 ||  || — || December 10, 2001 || Socorro || LINEAR || — || align=right | 4.5 km || 
|-id=712 bgcolor=#fefefe
| 64712 ||  || — || December 10, 2001 || Socorro || LINEAR || NYS || align=right | 4.8 km || 
|-id=713 bgcolor=#fefefe
| 64713 ||  || — || December 10, 2001 || Socorro || LINEAR || FLO || align=right | 2.0 km || 
|-id=714 bgcolor=#E9E9E9
| 64714 ||  || — || December 10, 2001 || Socorro || LINEAR || — || align=right | 3.5 km || 
|-id=715 bgcolor=#E9E9E9
| 64715 ||  || — || December 10, 2001 || Socorro || LINEAR || — || align=right | 6.1 km || 
|-id=716 bgcolor=#d6d6d6
| 64716 ||  || — || December 10, 2001 || Socorro || LINEAR || EOS || align=right | 5.4 km || 
|-id=717 bgcolor=#d6d6d6
| 64717 ||  || — || December 10, 2001 || Socorro || LINEAR || — || align=right | 4.5 km || 
|-id=718 bgcolor=#fefefe
| 64718 ||  || — || December 10, 2001 || Socorro || LINEAR || NYS || align=right | 1.7 km || 
|-id=719 bgcolor=#fefefe
| 64719 ||  || — || December 10, 2001 || Socorro || LINEAR || — || align=right | 2.5 km || 
|-id=720 bgcolor=#E9E9E9
| 64720 ||  || — || December 10, 2001 || Socorro || LINEAR || — || align=right | 4.1 km || 
|-id=721 bgcolor=#fefefe
| 64721 ||  || — || December 10, 2001 || Socorro || LINEAR || — || align=right | 2.3 km || 
|-id=722 bgcolor=#d6d6d6
| 64722 ||  || — || December 9, 2001 || Bergisch Gladbach || W. Bickel || THM || align=right | 6.4 km || 
|-id=723 bgcolor=#d6d6d6
| 64723 ||  || — || December 10, 2001 || Socorro || LINEAR || HYG || align=right | 4.6 km || 
|-id=724 bgcolor=#fefefe
| 64724 ||  || — || December 10, 2001 || Socorro || LINEAR || V || align=right | 2.1 km || 
|-id=725 bgcolor=#fefefe
| 64725 ||  || — || December 11, 2001 || Socorro || LINEAR || — || align=right | 4.3 km || 
|-id=726 bgcolor=#E9E9E9
| 64726 ||  || — || December 11, 2001 || Socorro || LINEAR || — || align=right | 3.0 km || 
|-id=727 bgcolor=#fefefe
| 64727 ||  || — || December 11, 2001 || Socorro || LINEAR || FLO || align=right | 1.8 km || 
|-id=728 bgcolor=#E9E9E9
| 64728 ||  || — || December 13, 2001 || Socorro || LINEAR || — || align=right | 4.8 km || 
|-id=729 bgcolor=#fefefe
| 64729 ||  || — || December 13, 2001 || Socorro || LINEAR || — || align=right | 1.9 km || 
|-id=730 bgcolor=#fefefe
| 64730 ||  || — || December 13, 2001 || Socorro || LINEAR || FLO || align=right | 3.2 km || 
|-id=731 bgcolor=#d6d6d6
| 64731 ||  || — || December 13, 2001 || Socorro || LINEAR || VER || align=right | 8.1 km || 
|-id=732 bgcolor=#E9E9E9
| 64732 ||  || — || December 14, 2001 || Socorro || LINEAR || — || align=right | 2.6 km || 
|-id=733 bgcolor=#fefefe
| 64733 ||  || — || December 14, 2001 || Socorro || LINEAR || ERI || align=right | 5.1 km || 
|-id=734 bgcolor=#fefefe
| 64734 ||  || — || December 14, 2001 || Socorro || LINEAR || — || align=right | 2.0 km || 
|-id=735 bgcolor=#fefefe
| 64735 ||  || — || December 14, 2001 || Socorro || LINEAR || — || align=right | 1.8 km || 
|-id=736 bgcolor=#fefefe
| 64736 ||  || — || December 14, 2001 || Socorro || LINEAR || — || align=right | 1.5 km || 
|-id=737 bgcolor=#E9E9E9
| 64737 ||  || — || December 14, 2001 || Socorro || LINEAR || HEN || align=right | 3.8 km || 
|-id=738 bgcolor=#fefefe
| 64738 ||  || — || December 14, 2001 || Socorro || LINEAR || FLO || align=right | 1.5 km || 
|-id=739 bgcolor=#d6d6d6
| 64739 ||  || — || December 14, 2001 || Socorro || LINEAR || 3:2 || align=right | 8.6 km || 
|-id=740 bgcolor=#d6d6d6
| 64740 ||  || — || December 14, 2001 || Socorro || LINEAR || — || align=right | 6.2 km || 
|-id=741 bgcolor=#fefefe
| 64741 ||  || — || December 14, 2001 || Socorro || LINEAR || FLO || align=right | 1.9 km || 
|-id=742 bgcolor=#fefefe
| 64742 ||  || — || December 14, 2001 || Socorro || LINEAR || — || align=right | 3.1 km || 
|-id=743 bgcolor=#fefefe
| 64743 ||  || — || December 14, 2001 || Socorro || LINEAR || NYS || align=right | 2.1 km || 
|-id=744 bgcolor=#fefefe
| 64744 ||  || — || December 14, 2001 || Socorro || LINEAR || — || align=right | 1.8 km || 
|-id=745 bgcolor=#E9E9E9
| 64745 ||  || — || December 14, 2001 || Socorro || LINEAR || MRX || align=right | 2.1 km || 
|-id=746 bgcolor=#fefefe
| 64746 ||  || — || December 14, 2001 || Socorro || LINEAR || V || align=right | 1.8 km || 
|-id=747 bgcolor=#d6d6d6
| 64747 ||  || — || December 14, 2001 || Socorro || LINEAR || — || align=right | 6.1 km || 
|-id=748 bgcolor=#d6d6d6
| 64748 ||  || — || December 14, 2001 || Socorro || LINEAR || — || align=right | 5.0 km || 
|-id=749 bgcolor=#d6d6d6
| 64749 ||  || — || December 14, 2001 || Socorro || LINEAR || THM || align=right | 5.7 km || 
|-id=750 bgcolor=#fefefe
| 64750 ||  || — || December 14, 2001 || Socorro || LINEAR || MAS || align=right | 3.2 km || 
|-id=751 bgcolor=#fefefe
| 64751 ||  || — || December 14, 2001 || Socorro || LINEAR || NYS || align=right | 1.7 km || 
|-id=752 bgcolor=#fefefe
| 64752 ||  || — || December 14, 2001 || Socorro || LINEAR || — || align=right | 2.2 km || 
|-id=753 bgcolor=#d6d6d6
| 64753 ||  || — || December 14, 2001 || Socorro || LINEAR || — || align=right | 5.2 km || 
|-id=754 bgcolor=#d6d6d6
| 64754 ||  || — || December 14, 2001 || Socorro || LINEAR || KOR || align=right | 3.0 km || 
|-id=755 bgcolor=#d6d6d6
| 64755 ||  || — || December 14, 2001 || Socorro || LINEAR || — || align=right | 9.0 km || 
|-id=756 bgcolor=#E9E9E9
| 64756 ||  || — || December 14, 2001 || Socorro || LINEAR || — || align=right | 3.0 km || 
|-id=757 bgcolor=#fefefe
| 64757 ||  || — || December 14, 2001 || Socorro || LINEAR || — || align=right | 1.9 km || 
|-id=758 bgcolor=#fefefe
| 64758 ||  || — || December 14, 2001 || Socorro || LINEAR || NYS || align=right | 5.0 km || 
|-id=759 bgcolor=#d6d6d6
| 64759 ||  || — || December 14, 2001 || Socorro || LINEAR || HYG || align=right | 5.4 km || 
|-id=760 bgcolor=#fefefe
| 64760 ||  || — || December 14, 2001 || Socorro || LINEAR || — || align=right | 1.9 km || 
|-id=761 bgcolor=#d6d6d6
| 64761 ||  || — || December 14, 2001 || Socorro || LINEAR || KOR || align=right | 3.1 km || 
|-id=762 bgcolor=#d6d6d6
| 64762 ||  || — || December 14, 2001 || Socorro || LINEAR || 7:4 || align=right | 8.8 km || 
|-id=763 bgcolor=#d6d6d6
| 64763 ||  || — || December 14, 2001 || Socorro || LINEAR || THM || align=right | 5.7 km || 
|-id=764 bgcolor=#d6d6d6
| 64764 ||  || — || December 14, 2001 || Socorro || LINEAR || — || align=right | 5.6 km || 
|-id=765 bgcolor=#fefefe
| 64765 ||  || — || December 14, 2001 || Socorro || LINEAR || — || align=right | 2.4 km || 
|-id=766 bgcolor=#E9E9E9
| 64766 ||  || — || December 14, 2001 || Socorro || LINEAR || — || align=right | 4.4 km || 
|-id=767 bgcolor=#fefefe
| 64767 ||  || — || December 14, 2001 || Socorro || LINEAR || V || align=right | 1.4 km || 
|-id=768 bgcolor=#fefefe
| 64768 ||  || — || December 14, 2001 || Socorro || LINEAR || NYS || align=right | 2.1 km || 
|-id=769 bgcolor=#d6d6d6
| 64769 ||  || — || December 14, 2001 || Socorro || LINEAR || — || align=right | 5.5 km || 
|-id=770 bgcolor=#fefefe
| 64770 ||  || — || December 14, 2001 || Socorro || LINEAR || EUT || align=right | 1.5 km || 
|-id=771 bgcolor=#fefefe
| 64771 ||  || — || December 14, 2001 || Socorro || LINEAR || ERI || align=right | 6.5 km || 
|-id=772 bgcolor=#E9E9E9
| 64772 ||  || — || December 14, 2001 || Socorro || LINEAR || — || align=right | 4.6 km || 
|-id=773 bgcolor=#d6d6d6
| 64773 ||  || — || December 14, 2001 || Socorro || LINEAR || EOS || align=right | 4.5 km || 
|-id=774 bgcolor=#d6d6d6
| 64774 ||  || — || December 14, 2001 || Socorro || LINEAR || — || align=right | 8.9 km || 
|-id=775 bgcolor=#fefefe
| 64775 ||  || — || December 14, 2001 || Socorro || LINEAR || NYS || align=right | 1.5 km || 
|-id=776 bgcolor=#fefefe
| 64776 ||  || — || December 14, 2001 || Socorro || LINEAR || — || align=right | 2.2 km || 
|-id=777 bgcolor=#E9E9E9
| 64777 ||  || — || December 14, 2001 || Socorro || LINEAR || DOR || align=right | 5.9 km || 
|-id=778 bgcolor=#E9E9E9
| 64778 ||  || — || December 14, 2001 || Socorro || LINEAR || HEN || align=right | 1.8 km || 
|-id=779 bgcolor=#E9E9E9
| 64779 ||  || — || December 14, 2001 || Socorro || LINEAR || — || align=right | 3.6 km || 
|-id=780 bgcolor=#fefefe
| 64780 ||  || — || December 14, 2001 || Socorro || LINEAR || NYS || align=right | 3.0 km || 
|-id=781 bgcolor=#fefefe
| 64781 ||  || — || December 14, 2001 || Socorro || LINEAR || NYS || align=right | 1.6 km || 
|-id=782 bgcolor=#fefefe
| 64782 ||  || — || December 14, 2001 || Socorro || LINEAR || — || align=right | 2.6 km || 
|-id=783 bgcolor=#fefefe
| 64783 ||  || — || December 14, 2001 || Socorro || LINEAR || — || align=right | 1.6 km || 
|-id=784 bgcolor=#E9E9E9
| 64784 ||  || — || December 14, 2001 || Socorro || LINEAR || — || align=right | 3.9 km || 
|-id=785 bgcolor=#E9E9E9
| 64785 ||  || — || December 14, 2001 || Socorro || LINEAR || BRU || align=right | 6.5 km || 
|-id=786 bgcolor=#E9E9E9
| 64786 ||  || — || December 14, 2001 || Socorro || LINEAR || — || align=right | 3.8 km || 
|-id=787 bgcolor=#E9E9E9
| 64787 ||  || — || December 15, 2001 || Socorro || LINEAR || — || align=right | 2.8 km || 
|-id=788 bgcolor=#fefefe
| 64788 ||  || — || December 14, 2001 || Bergisch Gladbach || W. Bickel || FLO || align=right | 2.2 km || 
|-id=789 bgcolor=#fefefe
| 64789 ||  || — || December 11, 2001 || Socorro || LINEAR || — || align=right | 2.2 km || 
|-id=790 bgcolor=#d6d6d6
| 64790 ||  || — || December 11, 2001 || Socorro || LINEAR || HYG || align=right | 4.9 km || 
|-id=791 bgcolor=#fefefe
| 64791 ||  || — || December 11, 2001 || Socorro || LINEAR || V || align=right | 2.3 km || 
|-id=792 bgcolor=#E9E9E9
| 64792 ||  || — || December 11, 2001 || Socorro || LINEAR || — || align=right | 4.2 km || 
|-id=793 bgcolor=#fefefe
| 64793 ||  || — || December 11, 2001 || Socorro || LINEAR || FLO || align=right | 1.6 km || 
|-id=794 bgcolor=#fefefe
| 64794 ||  || — || December 11, 2001 || Socorro || LINEAR || — || align=right | 1.8 km || 
|-id=795 bgcolor=#d6d6d6
| 64795 ||  || — || December 11, 2001 || Socorro || LINEAR || URS || align=right | 11 km || 
|-id=796 bgcolor=#E9E9E9
| 64796 ||  || — || December 11, 2001 || Socorro || LINEAR || GEF || align=right | 3.2 km || 
|-id=797 bgcolor=#E9E9E9
| 64797 ||  || — || December 11, 2001 || Socorro || LINEAR || — || align=right | 3.4 km || 
|-id=798 bgcolor=#fefefe
| 64798 ||  || — || December 11, 2001 || Socorro || LINEAR || — || align=right | 1.9 km || 
|-id=799 bgcolor=#fefefe
| 64799 ||  || — || December 11, 2001 || Socorro || LINEAR || FLO || align=right | 2.1 km || 
|-id=800 bgcolor=#fefefe
| 64800 ||  || — || December 11, 2001 || Socorro || LINEAR || V || align=right | 1.7 km || 
|}

64801–64900 

|-bgcolor=#fefefe
| 64801 ||  || — || December 11, 2001 || Socorro || LINEAR || — || align=right | 1.6 km || 
|-id=802 bgcolor=#E9E9E9
| 64802 ||  || — || December 11, 2001 || Socorro || LINEAR || — || align=right | 3.2 km || 
|-id=803 bgcolor=#fefefe
| 64803 ||  || — || December 11, 2001 || Socorro || LINEAR || V || align=right | 1.4 km || 
|-id=804 bgcolor=#d6d6d6
| 64804 ||  || — || December 11, 2001 || Socorro || LINEAR || — || align=right | 4.8 km || 
|-id=805 bgcolor=#E9E9E9
| 64805 ||  || — || December 11, 2001 || Socorro || LINEAR || — || align=right | 2.9 km || 
|-id=806 bgcolor=#fefefe
| 64806 ||  || — || December 11, 2001 || Socorro || LINEAR || — || align=right | 2.2 km || 
|-id=807 bgcolor=#E9E9E9
| 64807 ||  || — || December 11, 2001 || Socorro || LINEAR || EUN || align=right | 3.8 km || 
|-id=808 bgcolor=#fefefe
| 64808 ||  || — || December 11, 2001 || Socorro || LINEAR || — || align=right | 2.0 km || 
|-id=809 bgcolor=#E9E9E9
| 64809 ||  || — || December 11, 2001 || Socorro || LINEAR || MAR || align=right | 3.3 km || 
|-id=810 bgcolor=#E9E9E9
| 64810 ||  || — || December 14, 2001 || Socorro || LINEAR || HEN || align=right | 2.1 km || 
|-id=811 bgcolor=#fefefe
| 64811 ||  || — || December 15, 2001 || Socorro || LINEAR || V || align=right | 1.5 km || 
|-id=812 bgcolor=#fefefe
| 64812 ||  || — || December 15, 2001 || Socorro || LINEAR || MAS || align=right | 1.5 km || 
|-id=813 bgcolor=#d6d6d6
| 64813 ||  || — || December 15, 2001 || Socorro || LINEAR || THM || align=right | 4.6 km || 
|-id=814 bgcolor=#E9E9E9
| 64814 ||  || — || December 15, 2001 || Socorro || LINEAR || — || align=right | 2.8 km || 
|-id=815 bgcolor=#d6d6d6
| 64815 ||  || — || December 15, 2001 || Socorro || LINEAR || KOR || align=right | 2.1 km || 
|-id=816 bgcolor=#fefefe
| 64816 ||  || — || December 15, 2001 || Socorro || LINEAR || — || align=right | 1.5 km || 
|-id=817 bgcolor=#fefefe
| 64817 ||  || — || December 15, 2001 || Socorro || LINEAR || — || align=right | 2.3 km || 
|-id=818 bgcolor=#E9E9E9
| 64818 ||  || — || December 15, 2001 || Socorro || LINEAR || AGN || align=right | 2.1 km || 
|-id=819 bgcolor=#d6d6d6
| 64819 ||  || — || December 15, 2001 || Socorro || LINEAR || — || align=right | 6.7 km || 
|-id=820 bgcolor=#E9E9E9
| 64820 ||  || — || December 15, 2001 || Socorro || LINEAR || — || align=right | 4.5 km || 
|-id=821 bgcolor=#fefefe
| 64821 ||  || — || December 15, 2001 || Socorro || LINEAR || — || align=right | 4.2 km || 
|-id=822 bgcolor=#d6d6d6
| 64822 ||  || — || December 15, 2001 || Socorro || LINEAR || THM || align=right | 4.6 km || 
|-id=823 bgcolor=#d6d6d6
| 64823 ||  || — || December 15, 2001 || Socorro || LINEAR || 3:2 || align=right | 6.2 km || 
|-id=824 bgcolor=#E9E9E9
| 64824 ||  || — || December 15, 2001 || Socorro || LINEAR || — || align=right | 5.9 km || 
|-id=825 bgcolor=#fefefe
| 64825 ||  || — || December 14, 2001 || Socorro || LINEAR || — || align=right | 1.9 km || 
|-id=826 bgcolor=#d6d6d6
| 64826 ||  || — || December 15, 2001 || Socorro || LINEAR || HYG || align=right | 6.3 km || 
|-id=827 bgcolor=#E9E9E9
| 64827 ||  || — || December 15, 2001 || Socorro || LINEAR || — || align=right | 3.1 km || 
|-id=828 bgcolor=#fefefe
| 64828 ||  || — || December 15, 2001 || Socorro || LINEAR || NYS || align=right | 1.5 km || 
|-id=829 bgcolor=#fefefe
| 64829 ||  || — || December 15, 2001 || Socorro || LINEAR || NYS || align=right | 1.3 km || 
|-id=830 bgcolor=#E9E9E9
| 64830 ||  || — || December 15, 2001 || Socorro || LINEAR || — || align=right | 5.4 km || 
|-id=831 bgcolor=#E9E9E9
| 64831 ||  || — || December 15, 2001 || Socorro || LINEAR || — || align=right | 4.7 km || 
|-id=832 bgcolor=#E9E9E9
| 64832 ||  || — || December 14, 2001 || Socorro || LINEAR || — || align=right | 3.5 km || 
|-id=833 bgcolor=#d6d6d6
| 64833 ||  || — || December 14, 2001 || Socorro || LINEAR || — || align=right | 4.8 km || 
|-id=834 bgcolor=#E9E9E9
| 64834 ||  || — || December 14, 2001 || Socorro || LINEAR || — || align=right | 3.6 km || 
|-id=835 bgcolor=#E9E9E9
| 64835 ||  || — || December 15, 2001 || Socorro || LINEAR || MAR || align=right | 2.9 km || 
|-id=836 bgcolor=#E9E9E9
| 64836 ||  || — || December 7, 2001 || Socorro || LINEAR || HNS || align=right | 2.8 km || 
|-id=837 bgcolor=#E9E9E9
| 64837 ||  || — || December 18, 2001 || Needville || Needville Obs. || — || align=right | 3.4 km || 
|-id=838 bgcolor=#d6d6d6
| 64838 ||  || — || December 18, 2001 || Kingsnake || J. V. McClusky || — || align=right | 11 km || 
|-id=839 bgcolor=#E9E9E9
| 64839 ||  || — || December 19, 2001 || Fountain Hills || C. W. Juels, P. R. Holvorcem || EUN || align=right | 4.8 km || 
|-id=840 bgcolor=#E9E9E9
| 64840 ||  || — || December 19, 2001 || Cima Ekar || ADAS || — || align=right | 2.6 km || 
|-id=841 bgcolor=#E9E9E9
| 64841 ||  || — || December 17, 2001 || Socorro || LINEAR || — || align=right | 5.7 km || 
|-id=842 bgcolor=#fefefe
| 64842 ||  || — || December 17, 2001 || Socorro || LINEAR || — || align=right | 6.2 km || 
|-id=843 bgcolor=#d6d6d6
| 64843 ||  || — || December 17, 2001 || Socorro || LINEAR || KOR || align=right | 3.0 km || 
|-id=844 bgcolor=#d6d6d6
| 64844 ||  || — || December 17, 2001 || Socorro || LINEAR || THM || align=right | 7.0 km || 
|-id=845 bgcolor=#E9E9E9
| 64845 ||  || — || December 17, 2001 || Socorro || LINEAR || AST || align=right | 2.9 km || 
|-id=846 bgcolor=#d6d6d6
| 64846 ||  || — || December 17, 2001 || Socorro || LINEAR || KOR || align=right | 3.0 km || 
|-id=847 bgcolor=#E9E9E9
| 64847 ||  || — || December 17, 2001 || Socorro || LINEAR || — || align=right | 4.5 km || 
|-id=848 bgcolor=#d6d6d6
| 64848 ||  || — || December 17, 2001 || Socorro || LINEAR || — || align=right | 8.2 km || 
|-id=849 bgcolor=#d6d6d6
| 64849 ||  || — || December 17, 2001 || Socorro || LINEAR || 628 || align=right | 3.5 km || 
|-id=850 bgcolor=#E9E9E9
| 64850 ||  || — || December 17, 2001 || Socorro || LINEAR || — || align=right | 1.9 km || 
|-id=851 bgcolor=#fefefe
| 64851 ||  || — || December 18, 2001 || Socorro || LINEAR || — || align=right | 2.4 km || 
|-id=852 bgcolor=#E9E9E9
| 64852 ||  || — || December 18, 2001 || Socorro || LINEAR || — || align=right | 2.5 km || 
|-id=853 bgcolor=#fefefe
| 64853 ||  || — || December 18, 2001 || Socorro || LINEAR || — || align=right | 1.6 km || 
|-id=854 bgcolor=#fefefe
| 64854 ||  || — || December 18, 2001 || Socorro || LINEAR || — || align=right | 1.7 km || 
|-id=855 bgcolor=#d6d6d6
| 64855 ||  || — || December 18, 2001 || Socorro || LINEAR || — || align=right | 6.8 km || 
|-id=856 bgcolor=#fefefe
| 64856 ||  || — || December 18, 2001 || Socorro || LINEAR || — || align=right | 2.9 km || 
|-id=857 bgcolor=#E9E9E9
| 64857 ||  || — || December 18, 2001 || Socorro || LINEAR || — || align=right | 4.1 km || 
|-id=858 bgcolor=#fefefe
| 64858 ||  || — || December 18, 2001 || Socorro || LINEAR || — || align=right | 1.8 km || 
|-id=859 bgcolor=#fefefe
| 64859 ||  || — || December 18, 2001 || Socorro || LINEAR || — || align=right | 2.5 km || 
|-id=860 bgcolor=#fefefe
| 64860 ||  || — || December 18, 2001 || Socorro || LINEAR || — || align=right | 3.0 km || 
|-id=861 bgcolor=#fefefe
| 64861 ||  || — || December 18, 2001 || Socorro || LINEAR || — || align=right | 2.5 km || 
|-id=862 bgcolor=#d6d6d6
| 64862 ||  || — || December 18, 2001 || Socorro || LINEAR || THM || align=right | 6.7 km || 
|-id=863 bgcolor=#fefefe
| 64863 ||  || — || December 18, 2001 || Socorro || LINEAR || NYS || align=right | 3.8 km || 
|-id=864 bgcolor=#fefefe
| 64864 ||  || — || December 18, 2001 || Socorro || LINEAR || NYS || align=right | 4.3 km || 
|-id=865 bgcolor=#fefefe
| 64865 ||  || — || December 18, 2001 || Socorro || LINEAR || NYS || align=right | 1.4 km || 
|-id=866 bgcolor=#E9E9E9
| 64866 ||  || — || December 18, 2001 || Socorro || LINEAR || — || align=right | 3.4 km || 
|-id=867 bgcolor=#fefefe
| 64867 ||  || — || December 18, 2001 || Socorro || LINEAR || — || align=right | 2.3 km || 
|-id=868 bgcolor=#fefefe
| 64868 ||  || — || December 18, 2001 || Socorro || LINEAR || — || align=right | 2.3 km || 
|-id=869 bgcolor=#fefefe
| 64869 ||  || — || December 18, 2001 || Socorro || LINEAR || V || align=right | 1.8 km || 
|-id=870 bgcolor=#E9E9E9
| 64870 ||  || — || December 18, 2001 || Socorro || LINEAR || — || align=right | 2.2 km || 
|-id=871 bgcolor=#fefefe
| 64871 ||  || — || December 18, 2001 || Socorro || LINEAR || — || align=right | 2.3 km || 
|-id=872 bgcolor=#fefefe
| 64872 ||  || — || December 18, 2001 || Socorro || LINEAR || — || align=right | 1.7 km || 
|-id=873 bgcolor=#d6d6d6
| 64873 ||  || — || December 18, 2001 || Socorro || LINEAR || — || align=right | 7.0 km || 
|-id=874 bgcolor=#E9E9E9
| 64874 ||  || — || December 18, 2001 || Socorro || LINEAR || — || align=right | 5.1 km || 
|-id=875 bgcolor=#fefefe
| 64875 ||  || — || December 18, 2001 || Socorro || LINEAR || — || align=right | 1.9 km || 
|-id=876 bgcolor=#fefefe
| 64876 ||  || — || December 18, 2001 || Socorro || LINEAR || — || align=right | 2.4 km || 
|-id=877 bgcolor=#E9E9E9
| 64877 ||  || — || December 18, 2001 || Socorro || LINEAR || — || align=right | 2.9 km || 
|-id=878 bgcolor=#d6d6d6
| 64878 ||  || — || December 18, 2001 || Socorro || LINEAR || — || align=right | 5.9 km || 
|-id=879 bgcolor=#E9E9E9
| 64879 ||  || — || December 18, 2001 || Socorro || LINEAR || — || align=right | 1.5 km || 
|-id=880 bgcolor=#fefefe
| 64880 ||  || — || December 18, 2001 || Socorro || LINEAR || — || align=right | 2.2 km || 
|-id=881 bgcolor=#d6d6d6
| 64881 ||  || — || December 18, 2001 || Socorro || LINEAR || — || align=right | 4.1 km || 
|-id=882 bgcolor=#d6d6d6
| 64882 ||  || — || December 18, 2001 || Socorro || LINEAR || TRP || align=right | 7.1 km || 
|-id=883 bgcolor=#d6d6d6
| 64883 ||  || — || December 18, 2001 || Socorro || LINEAR || — || align=right | 5.4 km || 
|-id=884 bgcolor=#d6d6d6
| 64884 ||  || — || December 18, 2001 || Socorro || LINEAR || — || align=right | 5.1 km || 
|-id=885 bgcolor=#fefefe
| 64885 ||  || — || December 18, 2001 || Socorro || LINEAR || — || align=right | 2.2 km || 
|-id=886 bgcolor=#d6d6d6
| 64886 ||  || — || December 18, 2001 || Socorro || LINEAR || THM || align=right | 5.1 km || 
|-id=887 bgcolor=#fefefe
| 64887 ||  || — || December 18, 2001 || Socorro || LINEAR || — || align=right | 2.0 km || 
|-id=888 bgcolor=#fefefe
| 64888 ||  || — || December 18, 2001 || Socorro || LINEAR || NYS || align=right | 2.3 km || 
|-id=889 bgcolor=#fefefe
| 64889 ||  || — || December 18, 2001 || Socorro || LINEAR || NYS || align=right | 1.5 km || 
|-id=890 bgcolor=#d6d6d6
| 64890 ||  || — || December 18, 2001 || Socorro || LINEAR || — || align=right | 7.0 km || 
|-id=891 bgcolor=#E9E9E9
| 64891 ||  || — || December 18, 2001 || Socorro || LINEAR || — || align=right | 3.4 km || 
|-id=892 bgcolor=#fefefe
| 64892 ||  || — || December 18, 2001 || Socorro || LINEAR || — || align=right | 4.1 km || 
|-id=893 bgcolor=#fefefe
| 64893 ||  || — || December 18, 2001 || Socorro || LINEAR || — || align=right | 2.1 km || 
|-id=894 bgcolor=#fefefe
| 64894 ||  || — || December 18, 2001 || Socorro || LINEAR || — || align=right | 2.0 km || 
|-id=895 bgcolor=#d6d6d6
| 64895 ||  || — || December 18, 2001 || Socorro || LINEAR || THM || align=right | 7.3 km || 
|-id=896 bgcolor=#fefefe
| 64896 ||  || — || December 18, 2001 || Socorro || LINEAR || NYS || align=right | 4.0 km || 
|-id=897 bgcolor=#fefefe
| 64897 ||  || — || December 18, 2001 || Socorro || LINEAR || NYS || align=right | 1.9 km || 
|-id=898 bgcolor=#d6d6d6
| 64898 ||  || — || December 18, 2001 || Socorro || LINEAR || HYG || align=right | 5.6 km || 
|-id=899 bgcolor=#d6d6d6
| 64899 ||  || — || December 18, 2001 || Socorro || LINEAR || — || align=right | 7.7 km || 
|-id=900 bgcolor=#d6d6d6
| 64900 ||  || — || December 18, 2001 || Socorro || LINEAR || — || align=right | 6.8 km || 
|}

64901–65000 

|-bgcolor=#fefefe
| 64901 ||  || — || December 18, 2001 || Socorro || LINEAR || NYS || align=right | 1.5 km || 
|-id=902 bgcolor=#fefefe
| 64902 ||  || — || December 18, 2001 || Socorro || LINEAR || — || align=right | 3.0 km || 
|-id=903 bgcolor=#fefefe
| 64903 ||  || — || December 18, 2001 || Socorro || LINEAR || — || align=right | 1.5 km || 
|-id=904 bgcolor=#fefefe
| 64904 ||  || — || December 18, 2001 || Socorro || LINEAR || — || align=right | 1.9 km || 
|-id=905 bgcolor=#d6d6d6
| 64905 ||  || — || December 18, 2001 || Socorro || LINEAR || — || align=right | 4.7 km || 
|-id=906 bgcolor=#fefefe
| 64906 ||  || — || December 18, 2001 || Socorro || LINEAR || KLI || align=right | 4.2 km || 
|-id=907 bgcolor=#d6d6d6
| 64907 ||  || — || December 18, 2001 || Socorro || LINEAR || EOS || align=right | 5.0 km || 
|-id=908 bgcolor=#fefefe
| 64908 ||  || — || December 18, 2001 || Socorro || LINEAR || — || align=right | 5.3 km || 
|-id=909 bgcolor=#E9E9E9
| 64909 ||  || — || December 17, 2001 || Palomar || NEAT || — || align=right | 2.6 km || 
|-id=910 bgcolor=#fefefe
| 64910 ||  || — || December 17, 2001 || Palomar || NEAT || — || align=right | 2.1 km || 
|-id=911 bgcolor=#d6d6d6
| 64911 ||  || — || December 17, 2001 || Palomar || NEAT || EOS || align=right | 3.7 km || 
|-id=912 bgcolor=#fefefe
| 64912 ||  || — || December 17, 2001 || Palomar || NEAT || FLO || align=right | 1.7 km || 
|-id=913 bgcolor=#fefefe
| 64913 ||  || — || December 18, 2001 || Palomar || NEAT || — || align=right | 1.9 km || 
|-id=914 bgcolor=#d6d6d6
| 64914 ||  || — || December 18, 2001 || Palomar || NEAT || — || align=right | 5.2 km || 
|-id=915 bgcolor=#d6d6d6
| 64915 ||  || — || December 18, 2001 || Palomar || NEAT || — || align=right | 4.4 km || 
|-id=916 bgcolor=#E9E9E9
| 64916 ||  || — || December 17, 2001 || Socorro || LINEAR || — || align=right | 2.7 km || 
|-id=917 bgcolor=#fefefe
| 64917 ||  || — || December 17, 2001 || Socorro || LINEAR || — || align=right | 3.3 km || 
|-id=918 bgcolor=#d6d6d6
| 64918 ||  || — || December 17, 2001 || Socorro || LINEAR || — || align=right | 5.1 km || 
|-id=919 bgcolor=#fefefe
| 64919 ||  || — || December 17, 2001 || Socorro || LINEAR || — || align=right | 1.9 km || 
|-id=920 bgcolor=#fefefe
| 64920 ||  || — || December 17, 2001 || Socorro || LINEAR || — || align=right | 2.6 km || 
|-id=921 bgcolor=#d6d6d6
| 64921 ||  || — || December 17, 2001 || Socorro || LINEAR || — || align=right | 4.1 km || 
|-id=922 bgcolor=#d6d6d6
| 64922 ||  || — || December 17, 2001 || Socorro || LINEAR || EOS || align=right | 4.8 km || 
|-id=923 bgcolor=#E9E9E9
| 64923 ||  || — || December 17, 2001 || Socorro || LINEAR || — || align=right | 2.4 km || 
|-id=924 bgcolor=#E9E9E9
| 64924 ||  || — || December 17, 2001 || Socorro || LINEAR || — || align=right | 5.9 km || 
|-id=925 bgcolor=#d6d6d6
| 64925 ||  || — || December 17, 2001 || Socorro || LINEAR || — || align=right | 5.0 km || 
|-id=926 bgcolor=#d6d6d6
| 64926 ||  || — || December 17, 2001 || Socorro || LINEAR || — || align=right | 5.5 km || 
|-id=927 bgcolor=#fefefe
| 64927 ||  || — || December 17, 2001 || Socorro || LINEAR || — || align=right | 2.0 km || 
|-id=928 bgcolor=#E9E9E9
| 64928 ||  || — || December 18, 2001 || Socorro || LINEAR || — || align=right | 2.5 km || 
|-id=929 bgcolor=#fefefe
| 64929 ||  || — || December 18, 2001 || Socorro || LINEAR || V || align=right | 2.1 km || 
|-id=930 bgcolor=#fefefe
| 64930 ||  || — || December 18, 2001 || Socorro || LINEAR || ERI || align=right | 4.2 km || 
|-id=931 bgcolor=#fefefe
| 64931 ||  || — || December 18, 2001 || Socorro || LINEAR || NYS || align=right | 1.9 km || 
|-id=932 bgcolor=#d6d6d6
| 64932 ||  || — || December 18, 2001 || Anderson Mesa || LONEOS || ALA || align=right | 7.3 km || 
|-id=933 bgcolor=#fefefe
| 64933 ||  || — || December 19, 2001 || Socorro || LINEAR || FLO || align=right | 1.6 km || 
|-id=934 bgcolor=#d6d6d6
| 64934 ||  || — || December 19, 2001 || Socorro || LINEAR || — || align=right | 9.0 km || 
|-id=935 bgcolor=#E9E9E9
| 64935 ||  || — || December 18, 2001 || Palomar || NEAT || — || align=right | 2.3 km || 
|-id=936 bgcolor=#d6d6d6
| 64936 ||  || — || December 19, 2001 || Palomar || NEAT || — || align=right | 7.8 km || 
|-id=937 bgcolor=#E9E9E9
| 64937 ||  || — || December 17, 2001 || Socorro || LINEAR || — || align=right | 6.0 km || 
|-id=938 bgcolor=#d6d6d6
| 64938 ||  || — || December 17, 2001 || Socorro || LINEAR || THM || align=right | 7.6 km || 
|-id=939 bgcolor=#fefefe
| 64939 ||  || — || December 18, 2001 || Socorro || LINEAR || — || align=right | 2.3 km || 
|-id=940 bgcolor=#fefefe
| 64940 ||  || — || December 18, 2001 || Socorro || LINEAR || FLO || align=right | 1.8 km || 
|-id=941 bgcolor=#d6d6d6
| 64941 ||  || — || December 18, 2001 || Socorro || LINEAR || — || align=right | 9.5 km || 
|-id=942 bgcolor=#E9E9E9
| 64942 ||  || — || December 20, 2001 || Socorro || LINEAR || — || align=right | 3.3 km || 
|-id=943 bgcolor=#E9E9E9
| 64943 ||  || — || December 20, 2001 || Kitt Peak || Spacewatch || — || align=right | 7.3 km || 
|-id=944 bgcolor=#fefefe
| 64944 ||  || — || December 17, 2001 || Socorro || LINEAR || FLO || align=right | 1.5 km || 
|-id=945 bgcolor=#fefefe
| 64945 ||  || — || December 17, 2001 || Socorro || LINEAR || V || align=right | 1.5 km || 
|-id=946 bgcolor=#E9E9E9
| 64946 ||  || — || December 17, 2001 || Socorro || LINEAR || — || align=right | 4.4 km || 
|-id=947 bgcolor=#fefefe
| 64947 ||  || — || December 17, 2001 || Socorro || LINEAR || FLO || align=right | 2.5 km || 
|-id=948 bgcolor=#fefefe
| 64948 ||  || — || December 17, 2001 || Socorro || LINEAR || — || align=right | 2.4 km || 
|-id=949 bgcolor=#fefefe
| 64949 ||  || — || December 17, 2001 || Socorro || LINEAR || V || align=right | 2.6 km || 
|-id=950 bgcolor=#fefefe
| 64950 ||  || — || December 17, 2001 || Socorro || LINEAR || V || align=right | 1.6 km || 
|-id=951 bgcolor=#d6d6d6
| 64951 ||  || — || December 17, 2001 || Socorro || LINEAR || — || align=right | 7.6 km || 
|-id=952 bgcolor=#E9E9E9
| 64952 ||  || — || December 17, 2001 || Socorro || LINEAR || EUN || align=right | 3.0 km || 
|-id=953 bgcolor=#d6d6d6
| 64953 ||  || — || December 17, 2001 || Socorro || LINEAR || EOS || align=right | 4.3 km || 
|-id=954 bgcolor=#fefefe
| 64954 ||  || — || December 17, 2001 || Socorro || LINEAR || FLO || align=right | 2.1 km || 
|-id=955 bgcolor=#fefefe
| 64955 ||  || — || December 17, 2001 || Socorro || LINEAR || FLO || align=right | 1.7 km || 
|-id=956 bgcolor=#E9E9E9
| 64956 ||  || — || December 17, 2001 || Socorro || LINEAR || — || align=right | 6.5 km || 
|-id=957 bgcolor=#d6d6d6
| 64957 ||  || — || December 17, 2001 || Socorro || LINEAR || — || align=right | 4.8 km || 
|-id=958 bgcolor=#d6d6d6
| 64958 ||  || — || December 19, 2001 || Socorro || LINEAR || TIR || align=right | 6.1 km || 
|-id=959 bgcolor=#d6d6d6
| 64959 ||  || — || December 19, 2001 || Socorro || LINEAR || — || align=right | 3.9 km || 
|-id=960 bgcolor=#d6d6d6
| 64960 ||  || — || December 22, 2001 || Socorro || LINEAR || EOS || align=right | 3.5 km || 
|-id=961 bgcolor=#d6d6d6
| 64961 ||  || — || December 22, 2001 || Socorro || LINEAR || ALA || align=right | 6.0 km || 
|-id=962 bgcolor=#E9E9E9
| 64962 ||  || — || December 24, 2001 || Haleakala || NEAT || EUN || align=right | 3.8 km || 
|-id=963 bgcolor=#fefefe
| 64963 ||  || — || December 17, 2001 || Socorro || LINEAR || slow || align=right | 2.0 km || 
|-id=964 bgcolor=#d6d6d6
| 64964 ||  || — || December 19, 2001 || Palomar || NEAT || — || align=right | 6.7 km || 
|-id=965 bgcolor=#E9E9E9
| 64965 ||  || — || December 20, 2001 || Palomar || NEAT || — || align=right | 4.1 km || 
|-id=966 bgcolor=#d6d6d6
| 64966 ||  || — || December 19, 2001 || Palomar || NEAT || EOS || align=right | 5.7 km || 
|-id=967 bgcolor=#d6d6d6
| 64967 ||  || — || January 6, 2002 || Oizumi || T. Kobayashi || THM || align=right | 7.5 km || 
|-id=968 bgcolor=#fefefe
| 64968 ||  || — || January 6, 2002 || Socorro || LINEAR || PHO || align=right | 5.4 km || 
|-id=969 bgcolor=#fefefe
| 64969 ||  || — || January 5, 2002 || Socorro || LINEAR || PHO || align=right | 2.7 km || 
|-id=970 bgcolor=#fefefe
| 64970 ||  || — || January 9, 2002 || Oizumi || T. Kobayashi || — || align=right | 3.7 km || 
|-id=971 bgcolor=#E9E9E9
| 64971 ||  || — || January 5, 2002 || Kitt Peak || Spacewatch || — || align=right | 2.3 km || 
|-id=972 bgcolor=#d6d6d6
| 64972 ||  || — || January 11, 2002 || Desert Eagle || W. K. Y. Yeung || — || align=right | 3.6 km || 
|-id=973 bgcolor=#fefefe
| 64973 ||  || — || January 11, 2002 || Desert Eagle || W. K. Y. Yeung || — || align=right | 1.9 km || 
|-id=974 bgcolor=#d6d6d6
| 64974 Savaria ||  ||  || January 11, 2002 || Piszkéstető || K. Sárneczky, Z. Heiner || THM || align=right | 7.4 km || 
|-id=975 bgcolor=#d6d6d6
| 64975 Gianrix ||  ||  || January 10, 2002 || Campo Imperatore || CINEOS || — || align=right | 5.5 km || 
|-id=976 bgcolor=#E9E9E9
| 64976 ||  || — || January 8, 2002 || Socorro || LINEAR || GEF || align=right | 2.5 km || 
|-id=977 bgcolor=#d6d6d6
| 64977 ||  || — || January 5, 2002 || Haleakala || NEAT || — || align=right | 8.7 km || 
|-id=978 bgcolor=#fefefe
| 64978 ||  || — || January 7, 2002 || Haleakala || NEAT || — || align=right | 2.8 km || 
|-id=979 bgcolor=#fefefe
| 64979 ||  || — || January 5, 2002 || Haleakala || NEAT || V || align=right | 1.9 km || 
|-id=980 bgcolor=#d6d6d6
| 64980 ||  || — || January 5, 2002 || Haleakala || NEAT || — || align=right | 9.3 km || 
|-id=981 bgcolor=#fefefe
| 64981 ||  || — || January 8, 2002 || Palomar || NEAT || V || align=right | 1.6 km || 
|-id=982 bgcolor=#fefefe
| 64982 ||  || — || January 9, 2002 || Socorro || LINEAR || — || align=right | 3.8 km || 
|-id=983 bgcolor=#fefefe
| 64983 ||  || — || January 9, 2002 || Socorro || LINEAR || — || align=right | 2.0 km || 
|-id=984 bgcolor=#E9E9E9
| 64984 ||  || — || January 9, 2002 || Socorro || LINEAR || — || align=right | 4.5 km || 
|-id=985 bgcolor=#d6d6d6
| 64985 ||  || — || January 9, 2002 || Socorro || LINEAR || EOS || align=right | 3.3 km || 
|-id=986 bgcolor=#d6d6d6
| 64986 ||  || — || January 9, 2002 || Socorro || LINEAR || THM || align=right | 6.5 km || 
|-id=987 bgcolor=#E9E9E9
| 64987 ||  || — || January 9, 2002 || Socorro || LINEAR || — || align=right | 5.8 km || 
|-id=988 bgcolor=#fefefe
| 64988 ||  || — || January 9, 2002 || Socorro || LINEAR || EUT || align=right | 1.6 km || 
|-id=989 bgcolor=#fefefe
| 64989 ||  || — || January 9, 2002 || Socorro || LINEAR || — || align=right | 1.4 km || 
|-id=990 bgcolor=#d6d6d6
| 64990 ||  || — || January 9, 2002 || Socorro || LINEAR || HYG || align=right | 6.3 km || 
|-id=991 bgcolor=#E9E9E9
| 64991 ||  || — || January 9, 2002 || Socorro || LINEAR || — || align=right | 3.2 km || 
|-id=992 bgcolor=#d6d6d6
| 64992 ||  || — || January 9, 2002 || Socorro || LINEAR || — || align=right | 6.7 km || 
|-id=993 bgcolor=#fefefe
| 64993 ||  || — || January 9, 2002 || Socorro || LINEAR || — || align=right | 1.7 km || 
|-id=994 bgcolor=#fefefe
| 64994 ||  || — || January 9, 2002 || Socorro || LINEAR || NYS || align=right | 1.9 km || 
|-id=995 bgcolor=#E9E9E9
| 64995 ||  || — || January 9, 2002 || Socorro || LINEAR || — || align=right | 4.2 km || 
|-id=996 bgcolor=#d6d6d6
| 64996 ||  || — || January 9, 2002 || Socorro || LINEAR || EOS || align=right | 4.9 km || 
|-id=997 bgcolor=#E9E9E9
| 64997 ||  || — || January 9, 2002 || Socorro || LINEAR || — || align=right | 3.7 km || 
|-id=998 bgcolor=#fefefe
| 64998 ||  || — || January 11, 2002 || Socorro || LINEAR || — || align=right | 1.8 km || 
|-id=999 bgcolor=#E9E9E9
| 64999 ||  || — || January 11, 2002 || Socorro || LINEAR || — || align=right | 1.5 km || 
|-id=000 bgcolor=#C2FFFF
| 65000 ||  || — || January 11, 2002 || Socorro || LINEAR || L4 || align=right | 24 km || 
|}

References

External links 
 Discovery Circumstances: Numbered Minor Planets (60001)–(65000) (IAU Minor Planet Center)

0064